= Horton Corwin Hinshaw =

American physician

Horton Corwin Hinshaw Sr. (August 1, 1902, Iowa Falls, Iowa – December 28, 2000, San Rafael, California) was an American pulmonologist, known for the use of streptomycin as the first effective antibiotic for the treatment of tuberculosis (TB).

== Biography ==
H. Corwin Hinshaw was born into a Quaker family with roots in Quaker communities in North Carolina and Massachusetts. Some of his ancestors were among the first English colonists to settle on the eastern part of Long Island, near Horton's Point (where the Horton Point lighthouse is located). As part of a mostly Quaker community, he grew up on an apple farm near Greenleaf, Idaho and graduated from Greenleaf Friends Academy. In 1923 he graduated with a B.S. from the College of Idaho. From 1923 to 1924 he studied at the University of Pittsburgh. At the University of California, Berkeley, he graduated in 1926 with an M.Sc. and in 1927 with a Ph.D. in parasitology and was very briefly a faculty member as an instructor, before he went to Lebanon. There he taught at the American University of Beirut from 1927 to 1928 as an assistant professor and from 1928 to 1932 as an associate professor of parasitology. Upon returning to the United States he earned, within 2 years, an M.D. in 1933 from the medical school of the University of Pennsylvania. In 1933 Hinshaw, as a specialist in lung diseases, joined the staff of the Mayo Clinic. There he worked with William Hugh Feldman on animal models of tuberculosis infection and was an associate professor of medicine until 1949.

When streptomycin was isolated from Streptomyces griseus by Albert Schatz, Elizabeth Bugie, and Selman Waksman at Rutgers University, Hinshaw and William Hugh Feldman, working together at the Mayo Clinic, requested a sample of streptomycin for testing in their guinea pig animal model of tuberculosis infection. After streptomycin proved effective for treating infected guinea pigs, Karl Hamilton Pfuetze, M.D. (1908–1990), superintendent and medical director at the Mineral Springs Sanatorium in Cannon Falls, Minnesota, contacted Dr. Hinshaw, in October 1945, concerning Pfuetze's tuberculosis patient Patricia "Patsy" Jane Thomas (1922–1966).

Patricia Thomas married Robert Ward Stockdale on October 8, 1947, in Mower County, Minnesota. The Stockdales had two daughters and a son.

In 1949 Hinshaw moved with his family to Palo Alto, California and was affiliated with Stanford University School of Medicine as a clinical professor of medicine and head of the division of chest diseases from 1949 to 1959. In 1959 he moved to San Francisco and, at 450 Sutter Street, had an active internal medicine practice specializing in pulmonology in collaboration with his elder son, H. Corwin Hinshaw, Jr., M.D. Simultaneously, Dr. Hinshaw, Sr. was a clinical professor at the University of California, San Francisco, until he retired as professor emeritus in 1979.

He was the author or coauthor of more than 200 refereed articles. His textbook The Diseases of Chest (1st edition, 1956), coauthored with L. Henry Garland, was a pulmonary standard for many years.

Hinshaw served as the president of the American Trudeau Society (rename in 1960 the American Thoracic Society during 1948 to 1949 and received the Society's Trudeau Medal in 1958. In 1980 he was elected to the American Lung Association's Hall of Fame. In 1947 he was nominated for a Nobel Prize by Melvin Starkey Henderson, Henry William Meyerding (1884–1969), and Robert Delevan Mussey (1916–2015).

On August 6, 1924, in Pocatello, Hinshaw married Dorothy Kate Youmans (1902–1994). They had two sons and two daughters. Both sons became physicians. H. Corwin Hinshaw, Jr., M.D. (born 1927) shared his father's medical practice in San Francisco. William Ezra Hinshaw, M.D. (1937–1982) became an anesthesiologist. Barbara Hinshaw Baird (1931–1993) was a special-education resource specialist. Dorothy Hinshaw Patent (born 1940) is a zoologist and author of more than 100 nonfiction books for children.

== Selected publications ==
=== Articles ===
- Hinshaw, H. Corwin (1926). "Correlation of Protozoan Infections of Human Mouth with Extent of Certain Lesions in Pyorrhea Alveolaris". Proceedings of the Society for Experimental Biology and Medicine. 24 (1): 71–73. doi:10.3181/00379727-24-3233. S2CID 88387093.
- Alvarez, Walter C.; Hinshaw, H. Corwin (June 8, 1935). "Foods that commonly disagree with people". Journal of the American Medical Association. 104 (23): 2053–2058. doi:10.1001/jama.1935.02760230001001.
- Alvarez, W. C.; Hinshaw, H. C.; Frank, R. J. (1935). "Foods that 100 college girls would not or could not eat". Proc Staff Meet Mayo Clin. 10: 555–557. ("Cabbage, tomatoes, peppers, onions and fats were most commonly blamed for indigestion, while cauliflower, onions, coffee, cabbage, cucumber and "sour foods" were most commonly disliked.")
- Feldman WH; Hinshaw HC (1939). "The effect of sulfapyridine on experimental tuberculosis of the guinea pig". Proc Staff Meetings May Clin. 14: 174–179.
- Feldman WH; Hinshaw HC (1944). "Effects of streptomycin on experimental tuberculosis in guinea pigs: a preliminary report". Proc Staff Meet Mayo Clin. 19: 537–548.
- Hinshaw HC; Feldman WH (1945). "Streptomycin in treatment of clinical tuberculosis: a preliminary report". Proc Staff Meet Mayo Clin. 20: 313–318.
- Feldman, W. H.; Hinshaw, H. C.; Mann, F. C. (1945). "Streptomycin in experimental tuberculosis". American Review of Tuberculosis. 52 (4): 269–298. doi:10.1164/art.1945.52.4.269 (inactive 12 July 2025).
- Hinshaw, Corwin; Feldman, William H.; Pfuetze, Karl H. (November 30, 1946). "Treatment of Tuberculosis with Streptomycin: A Summary of Observations on One Hundred Cases". Journal of the American Medical Association. 132 (13): 778–782. doi:10.1001/jama.1946.02870480024007. PMID 21002442.
- Feldman, William H.; Hinshaw, H. Corwin (17 January 1948). "Streptomycin: A Valuable Anti-tuberculosis Agent". Br Med J. 1 (4541): 87–92. doi:10.1136/bmj.1.4541.87. PMC 2089248. PMID 18921002.
- Pyle, Marjorie McDonald; Hinshaw, H. Corwin (1952). "Help Yourself Get Well. A Guide for Tuberculous Patients and Their Families". Diseases of the Chest. 21 (6): 720. doi:10.1378/chest.21.6.720.
- Hinshaw HC (1982). "The dawn of chemotherapy of tuberculosis". Indian J Chest Dis Allied Sci. 24 (2–3): 179–183. PMID 6762340.

=== Books ===
- Hinshaw HC; Garland LH (1956). Diseases of the Chest. Philadelphia, Pennsylvania: W.B. Saunders. Garland was also the coauthor for the 2nd edition in 1963. Hinshaw was the sole author for the 3rd edition in 1969. The 4th edition in 1980 was coauthored by Hinshaw and John Frederic Murray (1927–2020); Hinshaw, H. Corwin; Murray, John F. (1980). Diseases of the Chest (4th ed.). Saunders. ISBN 0721646972.
