= Streptogrisin B =

Identifiers
- EC no.: 3.4.21.81
- CAS no.: 55071-87-9

Databases
- IntEnz: IntEnz view
- BRENDA: BRENDA entry
- ExPASy: NiceZyme view
- KEGG: KEGG entry
- MetaCyc: metabolic pathway
- PRIAM: profile
- PDB structures: RCSB PDB PDBe PDBsum
Search
- PMC: articles
- PubMed: articles
- NCBI: proteins

Streptogrisin B (EC 3.4.21.81, Streptomyces griseus protease B, pronase B, serine proteinase B, Streptomyces griseus proteinase B, Streptomyces griseus proteinase 1, Streptomyces griseus serine proteinase B) is an enzyme. This enzyme catalyses the following chemical reaction

Hydrolysis of proteins with trypsin-like specificity

This enzyme is isolated from Streptomyces griseus.
