= Waksman Institute of Microbiology =

Sign at the side entrance of the Waksman Institute

The Waksman Institute of Microbiology is a research facility on the Busch Campus of Rutgers University. It is named after Selman Waksman, a student and then faculty member at Rutgers who won the Nobel Prize for Medicine in 1952 for research which led to the discovery of streptomycin. The Nobel Prize is on display in the lobby of the institute. The institute conducts research on microbial molecular genetics, developmental molecular genetics, plant molecular genetics, and structural and computational biology.

In 2019, Dr. Kenneth D. Irvine was appointed as Interim Director of the Waksman Institute. Dr. Irvine has been a member of the Waksman Institute since 1995 and is currently a Distinguished Professor of Molecular Biology and Biochemistry and Director of the Rutgers Graduate Program in Cell and Developmental Biology. He was selected by his peers after the untimely passing of the Institute's fourth director, Joachim Messing.

== History ==
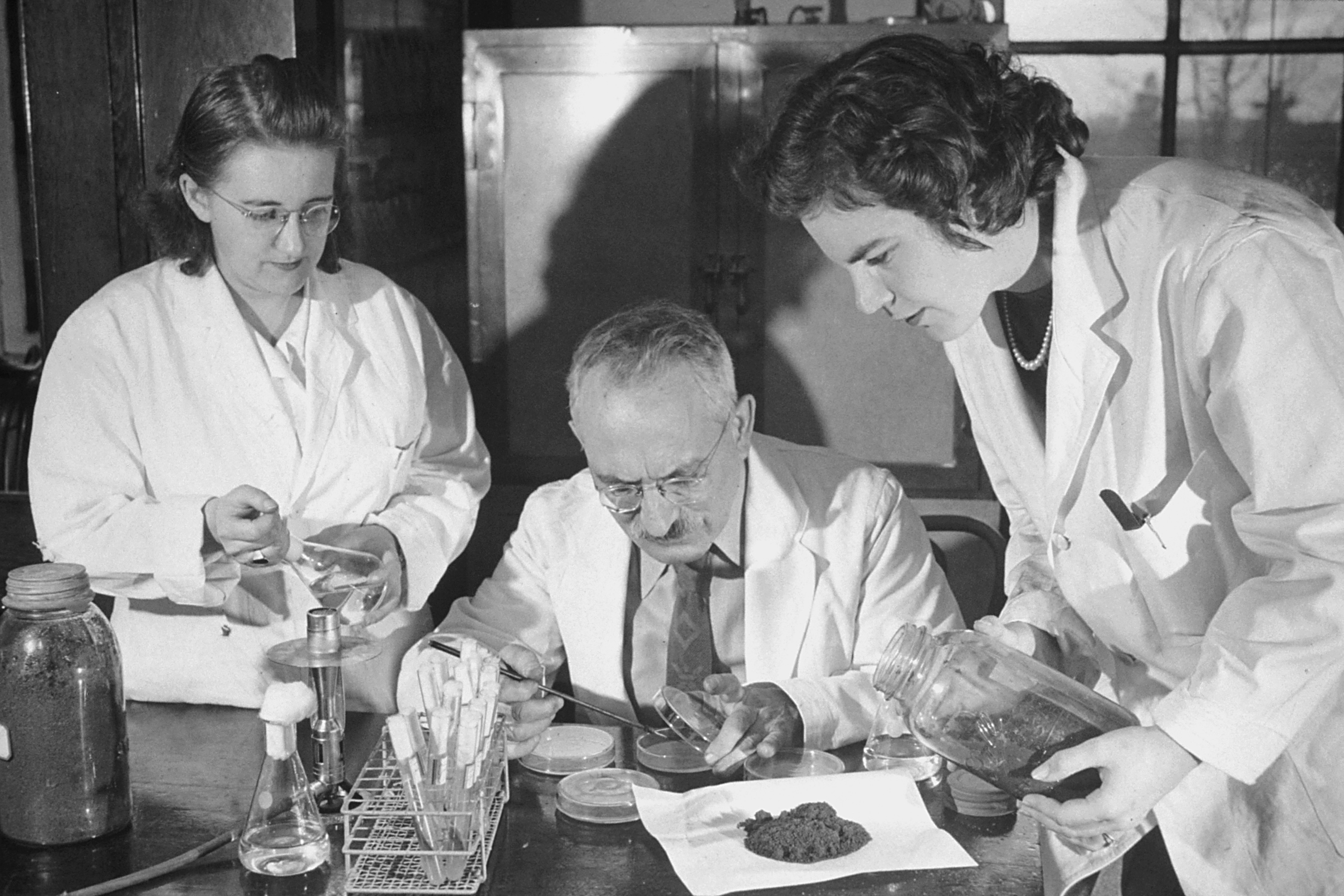
Waksman and two associates testing Streptomycin, a bacterial antibiotic produced by the soil actinomycete.

A total of eighteen antibiotics were isolated in Waksman's laboratory at the New Jersey Agriculture Experimental Station at Rutgers University. Of these, streptomycin and neomycin, and actinomycin were commercialized. Streptomycin, in particular, was the first antibiotic to cure tuberculosis. Waksman used half of his personal royalties from patents for streptomycin to create the Foundation for Microbiology in 1951. The Foundation is a private organization that funds and supports microbiology research.

He requested money from the Foundation to create the Institute of Microbiology at Rutgers. The idea for an institute that focused on soil science first came from Waksman's mentor, Dr. Jacob Lipman, who taught Waksman when he was an undergraduate student and later became his colleague. The institute was founded in on June 7, 1954 with Waksman as its first director. He retired in 1958.

Directors of the Waksman Institute of Microbiology

Selman A. Waksman (founder, 1954 - 1958)

Jay Oliver Lampen (1958 - 1980)

David Pramer (1980 - 1988)

Joachim Messing (1988 - 2019)

Kenneth D. Irvine (2019 - present)
