= Indolepyruvate C-methyltransferase =

Identifiers
- EC no.: 2.1.1.47
- CAS no.: 54576-88-4

Databases
- IntEnz: IntEnz view
- BRENDA: BRENDA entry
- ExPASy: NiceZyme view
- KEGG: KEGG entry
- MetaCyc: metabolic pathway
- PRIAM: profile
- PDB structures: RCSB PDB PDBe PDBsum
- Gene Ontology: AmiGO / QuickGO
Search
- PMC: articles
- PubMed: articles
- NCBI: proteins

Indolepyruvate C-methyltransferase (EC 2.1.1.47) is an enzyme that catalyzes the chemical reaction

indole-3-pyruvic acid
+ SAM
(R)-3-(indol-3-yl)-2-oxobutyric acid
+ SAH

This is a methylation reaction in which indole-3-pyruvic acid is converted to (R)-3-(indol-3-yl)-2-oxobutyric acid. The methyl group comes from the cofactor, S-adenosyl methionine (SAM), which becomes S-adenosyl-L-homocysteine (SAH).

Indolmycin

This enzyme is part of the biosynthetic pathway to the indole alkaloid, indolmycin, in Streptomyces griseus

== Nomenclature ==
This enzyme belongs to the family of transferases, specifically those transferring one-carbon group methyltransferases. The systematic name of this enzyme class is S-adenosyl-L-methionine: (indol-3-yl)pyruvate C-methyltransferase. Other names in common use include indolepyruvate methyltransferase, indolepyruvate 3-methyltransferase, indolepyruvic acid methyltransferase, and S-adenosyl-L-methionine:indolepyruvate C-methyltransferase.
