= Mycolysin =

Enzyme

Identifiers
- EC no.: 3.4.24.31
- CAS no.: 153190-34-2

Databases
- IntEnz: IntEnz view
- BRENDA: BRENDA entry
- ExPASy: NiceZyme view
- KEGG: KEGG entry
- MetaCyc: metabolic pathway
- PRIAM: profile
- PDB structures: RCSB PDB PDBe PDBsum
Search
- PMC: articles
- PubMed: articles
- NCBI: proteins

Mycolysin (EC 3.4.24.31, pronase component, Streptomyces griseus neutral proteinase, actinase E, SGNPI) is an enzyme. This enzyme catalyses the following chemical reaction

Preferential cleavage of bonds with hydrophobic residues in P1'

This enzyme is present in Streptomyces griseus, S. naraensis, and S. cacaoi.
