= Greenleaf Friends Academy =

Location
- Greenleaf, Idaho; United States
- 43.67266°N 116.820379°W

Information
- Type: Christian (Quaker)
- Motto: Inspiring students to think clearly, act responsibly, serve passionately. Based on Romans 12:2 "Do not conform to the pattern of this world but be transformed by the renewing of your mind so that you may discern what is the good, pleasing and perfect will of God."
- Religious affiliations: Quaker and interdenominational
- Established: 1908
- Oversight: 11 member Board of Trustees
- Principal: Christopher Browne
- Faculty: 22
- Grades: PreK-12
- Enrollment: 200
- Colors: Red and black
- Mascot: Grizzlies
- Yearbook: Stacie Workman
- IHSAA Division: 1A

Greenleaf Friends Academy is a private Christian school in Greenleaf, Idaho serving preschool through 12th grades.

Located in the Snake River Valley just 6 miles west of Caldwell, the academy has grown over the past century from a one-room schoolhouse into a facility consisting of classrooms, a gymnasium, elementary building, preschool building, cafeteria, athletic fields, and playgrounds.

It was founded in 1908 by a group of Friends (Quakers) as a college preparatory high school for the Quaker-founded community of Greenleaf, Idaho.

Junior High grades were added in the mid-1960s and Elementary grades added in the mid-1970s.

Local professionals, representing various Friends churches, other supporting churches, and the academy's alumni comprise the 11 member governing Board of Trustees.

Greenleaf Friends Academy holds affiliation with Associated Christian Schools International (ACSI), Northwest Yearly Meeting, part of Evangelical Friends International and holds state recognized school accreditation through AdvancEd.

== Notable alumni ==
- Emmett W. Gulley (1894–1981), missionary, professor, and president of Pacific College (now named George Fox University)
- H. Corwin Hinshaw(1902–2000), physician, professor, and pioneer of the use of streptomycin to cure tuberculosis
- Arthur O. Roberts (1922–2016), author, missionary, pastor, and professor of religion
