= Streptomyces mashuensis =

Scientific classification
- Domain: Bacteria
- Kingdom: Bacillati
- Phylum: Actinomycetota
- Class: Actinomycetes
- Order: Streptomycetales
- Family: Streptomycetaceae
- Genus: Streptomyces
- Species: S. mashuensis

Binomial name
- Streptomyces mashuensis (Sawazaki et al. 1955) Witt and Stackebrandt 1991

Type strain
- 449, ATCC 23934, BCRC 12420, CBS 279.65, CBS 918.68, CCRC 12420, CGMCC 4.2007, CIP 108143, DSM 40221, ETH 28385, IFM 1082, IFO 12888, IMET 42941, IPV 1986, ISP 5221, JCM 4059, JCM 4650, KCC S-0059, KCC S-0650, LMG 8603, NBRC 12888, NCB 258, NNRL B-3352, NNRL B-8164, NRRL B-3352, NRRL B-8164, NRRL B-B-8164, NRRL-ISP 5221, RIA 1165, Sawazaki 449, VKM Ac-949

Synonyms
- "Streptomyces kishiwadensis" Shinobu and Kayamura 1964; Streptomyces kishiwadensis (Shinobu and Kayamura 1964) Witt and Stackebrandt 1991; "Streptomyces mashuensis" Sawazaki et al. 1955; Streptoverticillium kishiwadense (Shinobu and Kayamura 1964) Locci et al. 1969 (Approved Lists 1980); Streptoverticillium mashuense (Sawazaki et al. 1955) Locci et al. 1969 (Approved Lists 1980); "Verticillomyces mashuensis" (Sawazaki et al. 1955) Shinobu 1965

Species of bacterium

Streptomyces mashuensis is a bacterium species from the genus of Streptomyces which has been isolated from soil in Japan. Streptomyces mashuensis produces streptomycin, monazomycin.

== See also ==
- List of Streptomyces species
