= Streptomyces longispororuber =

Scientific classification
- Domain: Bacteria
- Kingdom: Bacillati
- Phylum: Actinomycetota
- Class: Actinomycetes
- Order: Streptomycetales
- Family: Streptomycetaceae
- Genus: Streptomyces
- Species: S. longispororuber

Binomial name
- Streptomyces longispororuber Waksman 1953 (Approved Lists 1980)

Type strain
- ATCC 27443, BCRC 16212, CBS 789.72, CCRC 16212, DSM 40599, ETH 28545, Gause11668/54, IFO 13488, INA 11668, INA 11668/54, ISP 5599, JCM 4784, KCC S-0784, KCCS-0784, LBG A-3104, NBRC 13488, NCIB 9629, NCIMB 9629, NRRL B-3736, NRRL B-5761, NRRL B-B-5761, NRRL-ISP 5599, PCM 2396, PSA 188, RIA 1449, strain Ota, VKM Ac-1735

Synonyms
- Streptomyces longisporus ruber (Krasil'nikov) Pridham

Species of bacterium

Streptomyces longispororuber is a bacterium species from the genus of Streptomyces. Streptomyces longispororuber produces corallomycin.

== See also ==
- List of Streptomyces species
