= William Hugh Feldman =

American professor and researcher

William Hugh Feldman (November 30, 1892, in Glasgow, Scotland – January 15, 1974, in Rochester, Minnesota) was a doctor of veterinary medicine known for world-renowned achievement in two distinct fields, veterinary pathology and chemotherapy of experimental tuberculosis. He also made important contributions to the treatment of leprosy.

== Biography ==
In 1894 he immigrated with his mother to the United States, where they settled in a small frontier town in western Colorado. There he grew up and graduated from high school. At Colorado Agricultural College (now named Colorado State University), he matriculated in 1913, graduated with a D.V.M. in 1917, joined the faculty in 1917, and received an M.Sc. in 1926. From 1917 to 1927 he taught laboratory classes in pathology and bacteriology and also directed the band at College Agricultural College, with the exception of a leave of absence when in 1920 he studied pathology under Aldred Scott Warthin at the University of Michigan Medical School. In Rochester, Minnesota, from 1927 to 1944 Feldman was a veterinary research pathologist and an instructor of comparative pathology at the Mayo Foundation's Institute of Experimental Medicine. In 1944, he became a professor of pathology in the Mayo Foundation Graduate School of the University of Minnesota.

He expanded his M.Sc. thesis into a book with 410 pages. In 1932 he published the book Neoplasms of Domesticated Animals, which "was the first of its kind published in the English language" and "was acclaimed by reviewers in veterinary and medical journals all over the world." Feldman's second book, Avian Tuberculosis Infections, published in 1938, "is a splendid contribution to the literature on tuberculosis." He was the author or co-author of approximately 300 research papers.

A 1944 paper by Feldman and H. Corwin Hinshaw played an essential role in developing antibiotics to treat tuberculosis.

Feldman at the Mayo Clinic suggested to Selman Waksman to search for antibiotics that could effectively treat tuberculosis. Waksman was reluctant to do research on a potentially deadly bacterium such as Mycobacterium tuberculosis, the causative pathogen of tuberculosis. When Selman's student Albert Schatz learned about this he insisted that he should be allowed to work on an anti-tuberculosis drug, to which Waksman agreed. Feldman gave Schatz H-37, the most virulent tuberculosis bacterial strain in humans.

Under Waksman's direction, Schatz isolated, from the Rutgers Agriculture School's farm soil, a Streptomyces griseus strain that produced an antibiotic.

For one year from 1941 to 1942 Feldman was the president of the International Association of Medical Museums (renamed in 1955 the International Academy of Pathology). He was the first veterinarian to be honored with that presidency. For one year from 1941 to 1942 he was also the president of the United States and Canadian Academy of Pathology (USCAP). For one year from 1952 to 1953 he was the president of the American Association of Pathologists and Bacteriologists (AAPB).

He was an acclaimed expert in photomicrography. "He personally made all photographic illustrations for his publications, using a home-made device", which he described in a 1929 article in the Archives of Pathology. He made photographs of Sir William Osler, as well as Osler's home, laboratory, and instruments. Feldman made photographic portraits of many prominent physicians, especially pathologists, and medical researchers, including 14 Nobel Prize winners. In 1972 the U.S. National Library of Medicine displayed his photographic portraits of pathologists in the U.S. National Library of Medicine.

Feldman was given many awards and honors, including in 1946 the Pasteur Medal from the Pasteur Institute, in 1955 the Trudeau Medal from the National Tuberculosis Association, in 1957 the Distinguished Service Medal from the American College of Chest Physicians, and in the Varrier-Jones Memorial Medal, a British honor awarded for research in tuberculosis. He delivered in 1941 the John W. Bell Memorial Tuberculosis Lecture and in 1946 the Harben Lectures at the Royal Institute of Public Health and Hygiene. Colorado A&M (renamed from Colorado Agricultural College) gave him in 1945 an honorary D.Sc. and in 1950 made him an Honor Alumnus. In 1951 Gerhard Domagk nominated Feldman for a Nobel Prize.

In Colorado, Feldman married Esther Marsh Dickinson (1895–1932). Their daughter Esther Isabelle Feldman (1918–1960) married and had two children. William Hugh Feldman's second wife was Ruth Elaine Harrison. They had a son, William Harrison Feldman (born in 1938), who married Diane V. Nemeczek in 1973.

== Selected publications ==
=== Articles ===
- Feldman, W. H. (1930). "The Pathogenicity for Dogs of Bacilli of Avian Tuberculosis". Journal of the American Veterinary Medical Association. 76: 399–419.
- Feldman, William H.; Baggenstoss, Archie H. (July 1938). "The residual infectivity of the primary complex of tuberculosis". Am J Pathol. 14 (4): 473–490.3. PMC 1964987. PMID 19970404.
- Feldman, W. H.; Hinshaw, H. C.; Mann, F. C. (1945). "Streptomycin in experimental tuberculosis". American Review of Tuberculosis. 52 (4): 269–298. doi:10.1164/art.1945.52.4.269 (inactive 12 July 2025).
- Hinshaw, Corwin; Feldman, William H.; Pfuetze, Karl H. (November 30, 1946). "Treatment of Tuberculosis with Streptomycin: A Summary of Observations on One Hundred Cases". Journal of the American Medical Association. 132 (13): 778–782. doi:10.1001/jama.1946.02870480024007. PMID 21002442.
- Feldman, William H.; Henshaw, H. Corwin (17 January 1948). "Streptomycin: A Valuable Anti-tuberculosis Agent". Br Med J. 1 (4541): 87–92. doi:10.1136/bmj.1.4541.87. PMC 2089248. PMID 18921002.
- Van Patter, W.N.; Bargen, J.A.; Dockerty, M.B.; Feldman, W.H.; Mayo, C.W.; Waugh, J.M. (1954). "Regional enteritis". Gastroenterology. 26 (3): 347–450. doi:10.1016/S0016-5085(54)80024-2. PMID 13142217. (over 500 citations)
- Feldman, W. H. (January 1955). "Recruitment and training of veterinary research pathologists". J Am Vet Med Assoc. 126 (934): 10–13. PMID 13221501.

=== Books ===
- Feldman, William Hugh (1932). Neoplasms of Domesticated Animals. W. B. Saunders.
- Feldman, William Hugh (1938). Avian Tuberculosis Infections. Williams & Wilkins.
