= Penicillium parvum =

Scientific classification
- Kingdom: Fungi
- Division: Ascomycota
- Class: Eurotiomycetes
- Order: Eurotiales
- Family: Aspergillaceae
- Genus: Penicillium
- Species: P. parvum

Binomial name
- Penicillium parvum Raper, K.B.; Fennell, D.I. 1948

Type strain
- ATCC 10479, CBS 359.48, CSIR 740, FRR 2095, IFO 7732, IMI 040587, NBRC 7732, NRRL 2095, NRRL A-809, QM 1878

Synonyms
- Carpenteles parvum, Eupenicillium parvum, Eupenicillium papuanum Penicillium papuanum, Penicillium papuaneum

Species of fungus

Penicillium parvum is an anamorph species of fungus in the genus Penicillium which was isolated from soil in Papua New Guinea. Penicillium parvum produces ferrichrome siderophores

Phytochemical investigation of the soil microfungus Eupenicillum parvum led to the isolation of two new compounds: a chromone derivative euparvione and a new mycophenolic derivative euparvilactone, as well as thirteen known compounds. Several isolated compounds were evaluated for in vitro binding assays using opioid receptors (subtypes δ, κ, and μ) and cannabinoid receptors (CB1 and CB2). Compound 10 displayed the best selective μ-opioid receptor and CB1 receptor binding affinities showing values of 47% and 52% at a 10 μM concentration, respectively. These findings provide insight into the potential therapeutic utility of this class of compounds.
