= Busch Campus of Rutgers University =

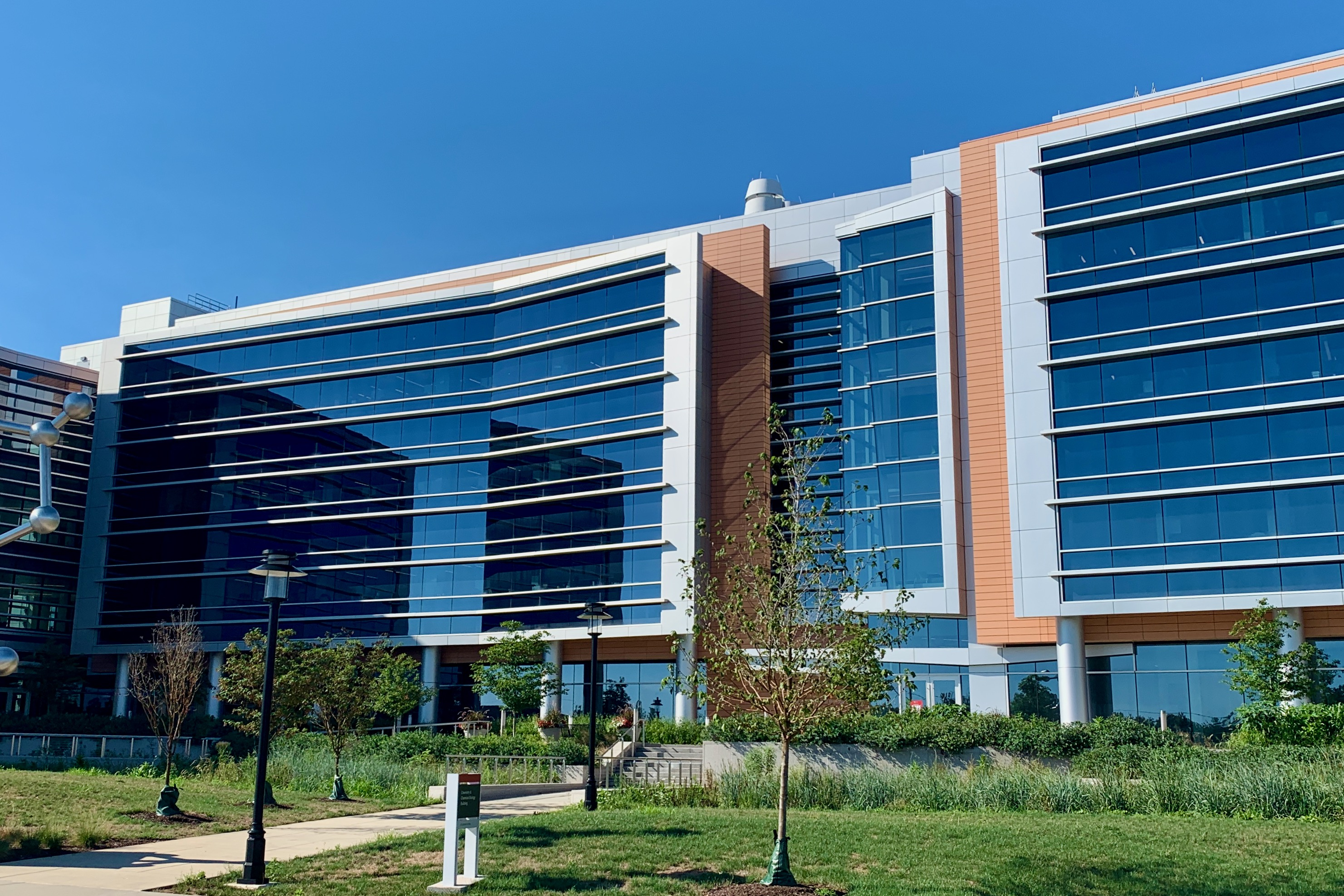
Chemistry and Chemical Biology Building on the Busch Campus of Rutgers University in Piscataway, New Jersey

Busch Campus is one of the five sub-campuses at Rutgers University's New Brunswick/Piscataway area campus, and is located entirely within Piscataway, New Jersey, US. Academic facilities and departments centered on this campus are primarily those related to the natural sciences: physics, pharmacy, engineering, psychology, mathematics and statistics, chemistry, geology, and biology. The Rutgers Medical School was also built on this campus in 1966, but four years later in 1970 was separated by the state and merged with the New Jersey Medical School and other health profession schools in Newark and New Brunswick to create the College of Medicine and Dentistry of New Jersey. Rutgers and the medical school, renamed Robert Wood Johnson Medical School in 1986, continued to share the land and facilities on the campus in a slightly irregular arrangement. On July 1, 2013, Robert Wood Johnson Medical School was officially merged back into Rutgers University, along with most of the other schools of UMDNJ, with the exception of the UMDNJ-School of Osteopathic Medicine.

The campus is named after Charles L. Busch (1902–1971), of Edgewater, New Jersey, an eccentric millionaire, who unexpectedly donated $10 million to the university for biological research at his death in 1971. The campus was formerly known as "University Heights Campus". The land was donated by the state in the 1930s, and a stadium was constructed. The land was formerly a country club, and the original golf course still exists on the campus.

== Student Housing ==
On the Busch campus at Rutgers University, several notable living buildings cater to different student needs and foster community engagement. The Suites is a residential complex designed for undergraduates, featuring three double bedrooms per suite, a shared living area, and a bathroom, which promotes a more shared living experience also offering common lounges, study areas, and laundry facilities. BEST Hall (Building for Engineering, Science, and Technology) serves as a living-learning community focused on engineering and science, providing students with modern amenities such as study lounges, seminar rooms, and collaborative spaces for group projects, along with educational programs that enhance academic success. Additionally, the BAMM dorms (Barr, Allen, Mattia, Metzger) feature double rooms along with common study and living areas, and encourages community involvement through events that bring the residents together. All living buildings on the Busch campus offer convenient access to dining halls, recreational facilities, and academic resources, with amenities like fitness centers, study lounges, and event spaces that enhance student life and promote a vibrant, supportive campus community.

== Selected buildings ==
- Waksman Institute of Microbiology is a research facility on the Busch Campus of Rutgers University. It is named after Selman Waksman, who was a faculty member who won the Nobel Prize for Medicine in 1952 for research which led to the discovery of streptomycin. 18 antibiotics were isolated in Waksman's laboratory. Streptomycin and neomycin, and actinomycin, were commercialized.
- Center for Advanced Biotechnology and Medicine (CABM) was established in 1985 to advance knowledge in the life sciences for the improvement of human health. It is jointly administered by the University of Medicine and Dentistry of New Jersey and by Rutgers, The State University of New Jersey. The building was completed in 1990, and has 100,000 square feet (9,300 m^{2}) of lab and office space.
- Hill Center for the Mathematical Sciences, named for George William Hill (Rutgers 1859), opened in 1971 and houses the Mathematics and Computer Science departments, along with a number of small centers. It also houses the Mathematical Sciences Library and a large underground data center.
- William Levine Hall houses the Ernest Mario School of Pharmacy.
- The Library of Science and Medicine is the main library for science and health collection of the Rutgers University Libraries system.
- The School of Engineering. The original four-wing building was opened in 1963.
- Richard Weeks Hall of Engineering is home to the Department of Civil and Environmental Engineering as well as various interdisciplinary and multi-use labs and classrooms.
- The Busch Campus Center and Busch Dining Hall
- Paul Robeson Cultural Center
- Administrative Services building I and two annex buildings
- Archive building for the University Library system
- Many residence halls and apartment buildings for undergraduate and graduate students
- SHI Stadium and Hale Center
- Yurcak field for lacrosse and soccer
- Sonny Werblin Recreation Center
- University President's compound
- Physics facilities
- Classroom buildings: SERC and ARC
- University of Medicine and Dentistry buildings
- Busch Campus Heat/Electricity Cogeneration plant

== Rutgers Golf Course ==
The Rutgers Golf Course, located on the university's Busch Campus in Piscataway, New Jersey, is an public course spanning over 6,300 yards of rolling terrain, mature trees, and water features. Previously a 9-hole course, it was expanded to an 18-hole course in 1963. It supports recreational play, hosts collegiate tournaments, and provides practice facilities for the Rutgers golf teams.

== Census-designated-place ==
Rutgers University-Busch Campus CDP
- Census-designated place
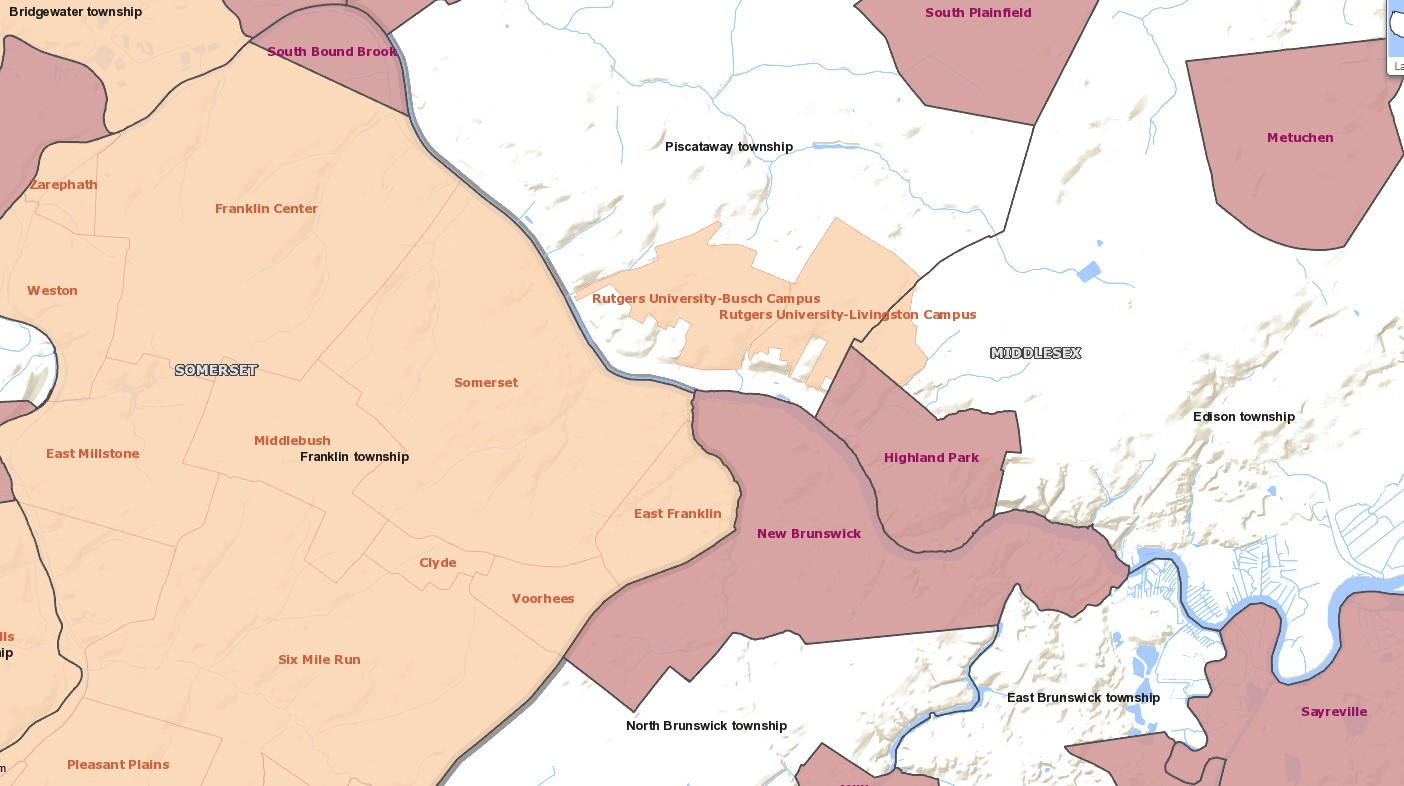

- Location within New Jersey Location within the United States
- Coordinates: 40°31′30″N 74°28′00″W
- Country: United States
- State: New Jersey
- County: Middlesex

Area
  - Total: 1.22 sq mi (3.17 km^{2})
  - Land: 1.22 sq mi (3.17 km^{2})
  - Water: 0 sq mi (0.00 km^{2})
- Elevation: 75 ft (23 m)

Population (2020)
  - Total: 4,586
  - Density: 3,749.6/sq mi (1,447.73/km^{2})
- Time zone: UTC−05:00 (Eastern (EST))
  - Summer (DST): UTC−04:00 (Eastern (EDT))
- FIPS code: 34-65249
- GNIS feature ID: 2806105

Rutgers University-Busch Campus CDP is a census-designated place (CDP) covering the residential population of the Busch Campus of Rutgers University in Piscataway Township, Middlesex County, New Jersey.

It first appeared as a CDP in the 2020 U.S. Census with a population of 4,586.

=== Demographics ===
Historical population
Census	Pop.	Note	%±
2020	4,586		—
U.S. Decennial Census; 2020

==== 2020 census ====
Rutgers University-Busch Campus CDP, New Jersey – Racial and ethnic composition Note: the US Census treats Hispanic/Latino as an ethnic category. This table excludes Latinos from the racial categories and assigns them to a separate category. Hispanics/Latinos may be of any race.
Race / Ethnicity (NH = Non-Hispanic)	Pop 2020	% 2020
White alone (NH)	1,116	24.33%
Black or African American alone (NH)	337	7.35%
Native American or Alaska Native alone (NH)	2	0.04%
Asian alone (NH)	2,482	54.12%
Native Hawaiian or Pacific Islander alone (NH)	3	0.07%
Other race alone (NH)	218	4.75%
Mixed race or Multiracial (NH)	6	0.13%
Hispanic or Latino (any race)	422	9.20%
Total	4,586	100.00%
