= Ferrichrome A =

Names
- IUPAC name (E)-5-[3-[(2S,5S,8S,11S,14S)-5,8-Bis[3-[[(E)-4-carboxy-3-methylbut-2-enoyl]-hydroxyamino]propyl]-11,14-bis(hydroxymethyl)-3,6,9,12,15,18-hexaoxo-1,4,7,10,13,16-hexazacyclooctadec-2-yl]propyl-hydroxyamino]-3-methyl-5-oxopent-3-enoic acid

Identifiers
CAS Number	15258-80-7
3D model (JSmol)	Interactive image
ChemSpider	4952558 Iron complex
EC Number	239-301-9
PubChem CID	101031659
- InChI: InChI=1S/C41H61N9O20/c1-22(16-34(57)58)13-31(54)48(68)10-4-7-25-38(64)44-26(8-5-11-49(69)32(55)14-23(2)17-35(59)60)39(65)45-27(9-6-12-50(70)33(56)15-24(3)18-36(61)62)40(66)47-29(21-52)41(67)46-28(20-51)37(63)42-19-30(53)43-25/h13-15,25-29,51-52,68-70H,4-12,16-21H2,1-3H3,(H,42,63)(H,43,53)(H,44,64)(H,45,65)(H,46,67)(H,47,66)(H,57,58)(H,59,60)(H,61,62)/b22-13+,23-14+,24-15+/t25-,26-,27-,28-,29-/m0/s1 Key: DKSPATNIHZSGOP-NJIQAGLESA-N
- SMILES: C/C(=C\C(=O)N(CCC[C@H]1C(=O)N[C@H](C(=O)N[C@H](C(=O)N[C@H](C(=O)N[C@H](C(=O)NCC(=O)N1)CO)CO)CCCN(C(=O)/C=C(\C)/CC(=O)O)O)CCCN(C(=O)/C=C(\C)/CC(=O)O)O)O)/CC(=O)O

Properties
Chemical formula	C_{41}H_{61}N_{9}O_{20}
Molar mass	999.982 g·mol^{−1}
- Except where otherwise noted, data are given for materials in their standard state (at 25 °C [77 °F], 100 kPa). Infobox references

Ferrichrome A is a siderophore in the ferrichrome family. Iron is an essential element for the survival and proliferation of organisms. Microorganisms produce and secrete potent iron chelators, also known as siderophores, to aid in the sequestration and increase bioavailability of iron. Since the discovery of ferrichrome in 1952, the ferrichrome family of siderophores contains at least 20 structurally distinct members of cyclic hexapeptides that chelate ferric iron via an octahedral coordination geometry through the oxygen atoms of the hydroxyl and the acyl groups of the three ornithine residues. Ferrichrome A was found as one of the two siderophores produced by the biotrophic basidiomycete Ustilago maydis during its saprotrophic growth phase. U. maydis is the causative agent of corn smut.

== Biosynthesis ==
In U. maydis, the ferrichrome A biosynthetic pathway begins with the HMG-CoA synthase (Hcs1) of acetyl-CoA and acetoacetyl-CoA for generation of hydroxymethyl glutaryl-CoA (HMG-CoA). The next step involves the conversion of HMG-CoA to methyl glutaconyl-CoA via enoyl-CoA hydratase (Fer4). Methyl glutaconyl-CoA is then coupled with hydroxy ornithine (derived from the ornithine monoxygenase, Sid1, of the precursor ornithine) via hydroxyornithine acylase (Fer5) to yield methylglutaconyl hydroxy ornithine. Cyclization of three methylglutaconyl hydroxy ornithine with a glycine and two serine amino acids via NRPS Fer3 yields ferrichrome A.

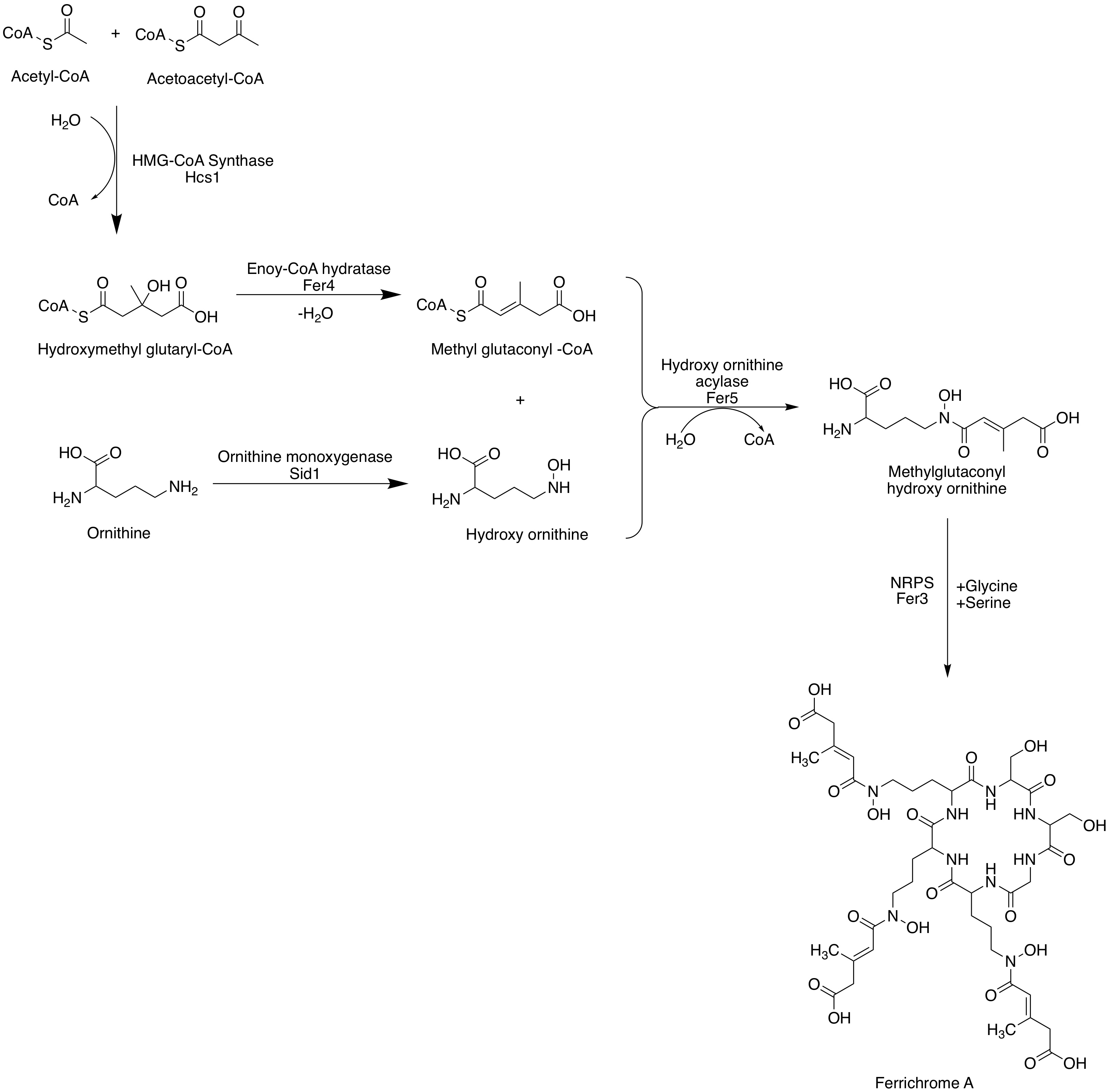
Biosynthesis of ferrichrome A in Ustilago maydis
