= Albert Schatz (scientist) =

American microbiologist and antibiotic discoverer (1920–2005)

- Albert Schatz
- Born: Albert Israel Schatz; 2 February 1920; Norwich, Connecticut, U.S.
- Died: 17 January 2005 (aged 84); Philadelphia, Pennsylvania, U.S.
- Education: Rutgers University
- Known for: Discoverer of streptomycin Deprived of credit for discovery, leading to change in US laws
- Spouse: Vivian Schatz (m. 1945)
- Children: 2
- Awards: 1994 Rutgers University Medal
- Scientific career
- Fields: Microbiology; Science education
- Workplaces: Brooklyn College; National Agricultural College in Doylestown; University of Chile; Washington University in St. Louis; Temple University
- Author abbrev. (botany): A.Schatz

Albert Israel Schatz (2 February 1920 – 17 January 2005) was an American microbiologist and academic who discovered streptomycin, the first antibiotic known to be effective for the treatment of tuberculosis. He graduated from Rutgers University in 1942 with a bachelor's degree in soil microbiology, and received his doctorate from Rutgers in 1945. His PhD research led directly to the discovery of streptomycin.

Born to a family of farmers, Schatz was inspired to study soil science for its potential applicability to take up his family occupation. Topping his class at Rutgers in 1942, he immediately worked under Selman Waksman, then head of the Department of Soil Microbiology, but was drafted to the US Army to serve in the World War II. After a back injury led to his discharge from the army, he rejoined Waksman in 1943 as a PhD student. Working in isolation from others due to his use of the dreaded tuberculosis bacterium (Mycobacterium tuberculosis), he discovered a new antibiotic which he named "streptomycin" that was proven safe and effective against the tuberculosis bacterium and other bacteria. He also contributed to the discovery another antibiotic albomycin in 1947.

The discovery of streptomycin led to controversies over its royalties from commercial production, and the Nobel Prize. Unbeknownst to Schatz, Waksman had claimed financial benefits only for himself and the Rutgers Research and Endowment Foundation. A lawsuit granted Schatz 3% of the royalties and legal recognition as the co-discover. Then, the 1952 Nobel Prize in Physiology or Medicine was awarded solely to Waksman explicitly "for his discovery of streptomycin," which The Lancet remarked as "a considerable mistake by failing to recognize Schatz's contribution." As an act of goodwill, Schatz was honored with the Rutgers University Medal in 1994.

== Early life and education ==
Schatz was born in Norwich, Connecticut, US, and attended schools at Passaic, New Jersey. His parents, Russian Jewish émigré father Julius Schatz and English mother Rae Schatz were farmers. He entered the College of Agriculture at Rutgers State University of New Jersey in 1932. He completed the Bachelor of Science with honours in soil science in 1942, topping his class. The day he received his result in May, he joined Selman Waksman who headed the Department of Soil Microbiology at Rutgers, as a postgraduate assistant. Waksman had been directing a research program searching for new antibiotic compounds produced by microorganisms in ordinary soil since 1937, and his teams were to discover more than 10 such chemicals between 1940 and 1952. A fellow student, Doris Ralston, described Schatz as "A poverty-stricken, brilliant student who worked with a burning intensity."

Schatz initially worked on the antibiotics, actinomycin, clavacin, and streptothricin, which Waksman had developed. He soon found out that these compounds were too toxic in animals to be of any practical usage in humans. After working for five months he was conscripted to the US Army in December 1942 during World War II. As a man with microbiology background, he was posted as a bacteriologist in the Medical Detachment of the Air Force, stationed in army hospitals in Florida. He was discharged on 15 June 1943 due to back injury.

With an option to work in a pharmaceutic company or pursue a PhD, Schatz chose the latter. He rejoined Waksman's lab from where he received a PhD in 1945 with the thesis "Streptomycin, an Antibiotic Produced by Actinomyces griseus." His PhD work led to the discovery of the first antibiotic, streptomycin, that is effective against tuberculosis.

== Career ==
After leaving Rutgers in 1946, Schatz worked at Brooklyn College, and the National Agricultural College in Doylestown, Pennsylvania. Much of Schatz's later work was on dentistry starting from 1953. While working as the Chief of the Division of Microbiology at the Philadelphia General Hospital, Schatz and his uncle Joseph J. Martin at the University of Pennsylvania Graduate School of Medicine developed a theory on the cause of tooth decay. The theory which they named "proteolysis-chelation theory" rooted in Schatz's original research in 1955. The full framework of the theory was published in 1962.

Schatz became the Most Distinguished Professor of the Faculty of Chemistry and Pharmacy at the University of Chile from 1962 to 1965, then professor of education at Washington University in St. Louis from 1965 to 1969, and professor of science education at Temple University from 1969 to 1980. At Chile, he continued to study the effects of fluoridation of drinking water.

== Discovery of streptomycin ==
On his return to Waksman's lab in 1943, Schatz offered to take on the search for an antibiotic effective against Gram-negative bacteria responsible for other penicillin-resistant diseases. There was no antibiotic then usable for the treatment of infections by Gram-negative bacteria – the only effective compound, streptothricin, although having low toxicity to leukocytes, was considered too toxic and too weak for clinical application. At that time, William Hugh Feldman at the Mayo Clinic had suggested Waksman to look for antibiotics that would fight tuberculosis. But Waksman had no intention as he was afraid to handle a bacterium as deadly as Mycobacterium tuberculosis, the causative pathogen of tuberculosis. When Schatz learned of this, he insisted that he take up a research on a tuberculosis drug, to which Waksman agreed. Feldman gave him H-37, the most virulent tuberculosis bacterial strain in humans that was available.

Waksman made sure that Schatz worked alone and remained isolated in the basement of the laboratory, and ordered Schatz that the bacterial samples should never leave the basement. Within three and a half months, Schatz had identified two related strains of bacteria (Streptomyces griseus) that belong to the group (order) Actinomycetes whose secretions stopped the growth of tuberculosis bacterium and several Gram-negative bacteria. One strain came from a throat swab of a healthy chicken, the other from a heavily manured field soil. He recollected his research saying:

During that time, I slept on a wooden bench in the laboratory. I drew a horizontal line with a red glassmarking pencil on the flasks from which I was distilling. If I was asleep when the liquid boiled down to the red mark, the night watchman woke me up and I added more liquid. This was during World War II when rationing was in effect. I therefore recycled organic solvents that I used in sufficiently large volumes to justify recycling. I worked day and night to produce that streptomycin because I wanted Feldman to do toxicity and in vivo tests as soon as possible, and because Waksman did not assign anyone to help me.

In the afternoon of 19 October, Schatz noticed that the tuberculosis bacteria were killed by his actinomycete extract, which he gave the name "streptomycin" following the scientific name of the source and the earlier antibiotic streptothricin discovered by Waksman and H. Boyd Woodruff in 1942. The bacteria from chicken used in the experiment was provided by another researcher Doris Jones, and Elizabeth Bugie performed the antibacterial tests. Schatz, Bugie and Waksman reported the discovery in the journal Experimental Biology and Medicine which published it on 1 January 1944. The new compound was effective against both Gram-negative and Gram-positive bacteria, as well as the human strain of tuberculosis bacterium, which is neither a Gram-negative or Gram-positive species. Their conclusion states:

Streptomycin, like streptothricin, possesses strong bactericidal properties, and preliminary experiments tended to indicate that the two substances are also comparable in their low toxicity to animals and in their in vivo activity. The various chemical and biological properties of streptomycin tend to point to this compound as one closely related to streptothricin; the fact that it differs from the latter in the nature of its antibacterial activity may indicate a closely related but not the same type of molecule.

With his lab mates, Schatz announced on 4 August 1944 the effectiveness of streptomycin in vivo in experimental tuberculosis in mice. He and Waksman reported the effectiveness of streptomycin against different strains of tuberculosis bacterium and other related pathogens on 1 November 1944, and published a series of papers on the production of streptomycin and related antibiotics the next year. In 1946, they identified that only specific species of actinomycetes produce streptomycin.

Feldman and his team conducted the first clinical trial and toxicity tests at the Mayo Clinic in late 1944 and reported it in 1945. The first individual treated was a 21-year-old girl who had advanced pulmonary tuberculosis and was given streptomycin on 20 November 1944. By 1946, experiments conducted under the projects of Merck in the UK and USA had proven streptomycin's effectiveness against TB, bubonic plague, cholera, typhoid fever, and other penicillin-resistant diseases. All the original samples in clinical trials were prepared by Schatz alone.

=== Patent, lawsuit and settlement (1946-1950) ===
Waksman knew that patenting streptomycin could be difficult because US patent law prohibited natural products and Schatz method had no particular novelty. With the help of the Merck lawyers who had aided him patenting actinomycin and streptothricin, he argued that the new compound was chemically distinct from the natural compound in the bacteria. This convinced the patenting authority.

In the patent agreement on 1 May 1946, both Schatz and Waksman agreed to receive a token $1.00 as recognition for being the inventors of the streptomycin production method, so that the beneficiary would be Rutgers and not individuals. Schatz agreed to make streptomycin available as readily and inexpensively as possible, and he understood that the foundation also was to receive no profit from the discovery. At Waksman's request, Schatz signed over his right to royalties from the US streptomycin patent to the Rutgers Research and Endowment Foundation, and later signed over his foreign rights. The US Patent Office granted U.S. patent 2,449,866 titled "Improvement in Streptomycin and Processes of Preparation" to Schatz and Waksman on 21 September 1948. Merck was to get an exclusive right for commercial production. Schatz was the lead author of the paper on streptomycin discovery with Bugie as the second. Bugie was excluded from the patent due to Waksman's impression that she would "just get married." Years later Bugie told her daughters, "If women's lib had been around, my name would have been on the patent."

Schatz began to feel that Waksman was playing down his (Schatz's) role in the discovery and taking all the credit. In 1949, it became publicised that Waksman, contrary to his public pronouncements, had a private agreement with the foundation giving him 20% of the royalties – which by then had amounted to $350,000 ($4,736,000 adjusted for inflation) – and the Rutgers foundation 80%. In March 1950, Schatz, filed a lawsuit against Waksman and the foundation for a share of the royalties and recognition of his role in the discovery of streptomycin. Bugie supported Schatz on the discovery, but did not participate in the royalty matter. Waksman denied receiving any financial benefits. After the court trial on 29 December 1950, the Superior Court of New Jersey issued the verdict in favor of Schatz, concluding that "[Schatz] is entitled to credit legally and scientifically as co-discoverer, with Dr. Selman A. Waksman, of streptomycin."

An out-of-court settlement awarded Schatz $120,000 for the foreign patent rights, and 3% of the royalties, representing about $15,000 per annum for several years. Waksman got 10% and 7% was evenly distributed to all workers in Waksman's lab. With its 80% share, the Rutgers established the Waksman Institute of Microbiology. Schatz was never again able to find work in a top-level microbiology lab.

=== Nobel Prize 1952 and controversy ===
In October 1952, Waksman was announced as the sole winner of the 1952 Nobel Prize in Physiology or Medicine "for his discovery of streptomycin, the first antibiotic effective against tuberculosis." The Nobel committee statement given by presenter Arvid Wallgren at the award ceremony in Stockholm on 12 December 1952 was "Selman Waksman, the Caroline Medical Institute has awarded you this year's Nobel Prize for Physiology or Medicine for your ingenious, systematic and successful studies of the soil microbes that led to the discovery of streptomycin" rather than "for the discovery of streptomycin" as the original announcement said. But the official citation was specific "for his discovery". In his accounts on streptomycin discovery, Waksman never mentioned Schatz. When Feldman performed the first clinical trial of streptomycin, he did not know that the new drug had been discovered by Schatz, and it was much later in Chile (the 1960s) where he met Schatz that the story was brought up in their conversation.

In the 1980s Milton Wainwright from Sheffield University interviewed Rutgers faculty members for his 1990 book on antibiotics, Miracle Cure, asking questions about Schatz, it piqued the curiosity of some professors, who made their own inquiries and spoke with Schatz. A group of professors, including Karl Maramorosch and Douglas Eveleigh, began to lobby for Schatz's rehabilitation, because they were convinced that Schatz had been the victim of an injustice. This culminated in Rutgers awarding him the 1994 Rutgers University Medal, the university's highest honor.

In 2005, The Lancet commented: "The Nobel committee made a considerable mistake by failing to recognise Schatz's contribution."

== Discovery of albomycin ==
The discovery of streptomycin was followed by that of grisein. Donald M. Reynolds, Schatz and Waksman reported the discovery in 1947. The new antibiotic was isolated from the same bacteria that produced streptomycin. It was not as powerful as streptomycin or streptothricin, but was less toxic and effective against most Gram-negative and Gram-positive bacteria. When other related compounds were discovered from other bacteria, grisein was considered as member of a more specific compound, albomycin. These compounds were later commonly referred to as "Trojan horse" antibiotics for their ability to act as their molecular targets inside the cells.

== Dental research and controversy (1954-1992) ==
Since 1945, the US has advocated water fluoridation to prevent tooth decay. Supported by his uncle Martin, Schatz investigated the cause of tooth decay from the mid-1950s. When he began he was surprised to learn that the cause of tooth decay was tacitly assumed to be acidity in the mouth, without any experimental evidence. The acid theory, as it was known, stated that hydrogen ions (which determine pH) are the critical factor for dental health. But his experiments showed that tooth decay occurs regardless of acidity or alkalinity. in 1962, he and his uncle offered a new explanation for tooth decay, the "proteolysis-chelation theory." (He later referred to his original 1954 theory as the "chelation theory.") The theory emphasized biochemical reactions over acid demineralization. According to the theory, caries develop as bacteria invade the teeth cavities in the presence of organic compounds (chelating agents) such as sugars, lipids and citrates to break down (proteolyze) the tooth protein (keratin); the process is independent of the pH of the environment.

His findings also led him to oppose the fluoridation of drinking water based on his understanding of the biochemical impact of fluoride on tissue. He challenged the fluoridation of drinking water by public health programs. Reporting in 1967 the "Increased death rate in Chile associated with artificial fluoridation of drinking water, with implications for other Latin American countries and for the United States," he further claimed that in Chile, water fluoridation not only failed to prevent tooth decay, but instead caused increased cancer that led to increased death among people with malnutrition. He also criticized a scientific paper published in 1966 that presented the advantages of water fluoridation in the Curico province of Chile, arguing that the data was incomplete. In 1978, the US Department of Health Centers for Disease Control in Atlanta issued a public statement that Schatz's data was improperly analyzed and did not present the true relationship between water fluoridation and cancer and mortality with the conclusion: "Water fluoridation for the purpose of dental caries prophylaxis poses no hazard relevant to cancer causation." In 1992, he was severely criticized in The New Zealand Medical Journal for bias and publication in an obscure journal. He responded by claiming that the publication was in a legitimate journal, and that the critics had overlooked a separate publication in The Journal of Nihon University School of Dentistry.

== Personal life ==
Schatz's initial interest in soil microbiology stemmed from his intention to become a farmer following his parents. Seeing workers being assaulted by the authorities during the Depression prompted him to lifelong socialism and humanitarianism. He married Vivian Rosenfeld, a student at New Jersey College for Women, in March 1945 and they had two daughters, Linda and Diane.

Schatz died of pancreatic cancer at his home in Philadelphia.

== Awards, honors and tributes ==
Schatz received honorary degrees from Brazil, Peru, Chile, and the Dominican Republic. On the 50th anniversary of the discovery of streptomycin, in 1994, he was awarded the Rutgers University Medal. The New York Times placed Schatz and Waksman's 1948 streptomycin patent in the top 10 discoveries of the 20th century. The university has made Schatz's basement lab into a museum documenting his and other antibiotic discoveries made at the college.

== Legacy ==
As a result of the streptomycin controversy, regulations were passed in the US aimed at ensuring graduate students get due recognition and reward for their contributions. Albert Schatz's archives were donated to the Temple University Library.

== See also ==
- Nobel Prize controversies
