= Center for Advanced Biotechnology and Medicine =

US research center

Center for Advanced Biotechnology & Medicine
- Abbreviation: CABM
- Formation: 1985
- Merger of: UMDNJ
- Location: Piscataway, New Jersey

The Center for Advanced Biotechnology and Medicine (CABM) is located on Busch Campus in Piscataway, New Jersey. It was established in 1985 to advance knowledge in the life sciences for the improvement of human health. It is administered by Rutgers, The State University of New Jersey. The building was completed in 1990, and has 100,000 square feet (10,000 m^{2}) of lab and office space. It now is part of Rutgers Biomedical and Health Sciences campus that was created following the merger of UMDNJ.

== Affiliated staff ==
- Aaron D. Milstein, PhD, Director of CABM Bioinformatics Program
- Anat Kreimer, PhD, Computational Functional Genomics Lab
- Mani Subramanian, Scientific Computing Specialist

=== Molecular Biology and Biochemistry faculty ===
- Steven J. Brill, PhD
- Samuel Bunting, PhD
