= Sideromycin =

Class of chemical compounds

Albomycin δ2, a sideromycin, bound to iron

Sideromycins are a group of antibiotics linked to siderophores by covalent bonds. Examples of naturally occurring sideromycins are albomycin and salmycin. Sideromycins have some unique merits as antibiotic. They can actively bypass permeability barriers (membranes) to deliver the drug inside the target bacterial cell, irrespective of the size and polarity of the antibiotic moiety contained into it. Most importantly as they are substrates of high affinity siderophore transport systems they can be effective to kill bacteria at very low concentration. Also the delivery of the antibiotic will be highly target specific, so wouldn't affect the host system. Sideromycins is being considered as a new microbe-selective antibacterial agent, which can limit the emergence of resistance.
