= Albomycin =

Group of chemical compounds

Albomycin δ2 bound to iron

Albomycins are a group of naturally occurring antibiotics belonging to the class of sideromycins, which are "compounds composed of iron carriers called siderophores linked to antibiotic moieties". They are particularly effective against Gram-negative bacteria of the family Enterobacteriaceae and few Gram-positive bacteria such as Streptococcus pneumoniae, Bacillus subtilis, and Staphylococcus aureus. In 2000 a group of scientists from SmithKline Beecham Pharmaceuticals, UK reported that the antibiotic part of albomycin in vitro can inhibit seryl-tRNA synthetase from both eukaryotic and prokaryotic representatives.

== Structure ==
Albomycins are naturally occurring sideromycins produced by some streptomycetes. The siderophore part of albomycin δ2 is similar to ferrichrome. It contains three molecules of δ-N-hydroxy-δ-N-acetyl ornithine linked to a serine, all by peptide linkage. The C-terminus of the serine is linked to another serine attached to the antibiotically active 4’-thio (N4-carbamoyl-3-methyl) cytidine moiety. The trihydroxamate part serves the siderophore function as it can trap Fe^{3+} and is essential for active transport of the antibiotic. Iron-free albomycin δ2 has a molecular weight of 992 Da, and when loaded with iron it is 1045 Da.

Albomycin δ1

Albomycin δ2

Albomycin ε
