= Margaret Hotchkiss =

American microbiologist

- Education: Yale University
- Scientific career
- Workplaces: University of Kentucky
- Thesis: The influence of various salts upon the growth of bacterium communities (1922)

Margaret Hotchkiss was a distinguished professor at the University of Kentucky. She is a microbiologist known for her work on bacteria in seawater and sewage, and fungi that cause disease. In 1957, she was elected a fellow of the American Academy of Microbiology.

== Education and career ==
Hotchkiss grew up in Brooklyn, New York, and graduated from Packer Collegiate Institute and Vassar College. In 1922, Hotchkiss earned a Ph.D. from Yale University. Hotchkiss worked at New York Medical College for seventeen years. She also worked at Woods Hole Oceanographic Institution as a visiting researcher, and was a bacteriologist at the New Jersey Agricultural Experiment Station, and the Department of Health in Paterson, New Jersey. In 1945 Hotchkiss joined the faculty at the University of Kentucky, where she was promoted to associate professor in 1946. She later became the head of the mycology department at the University of Kentucky, and was named a distinguished professor in 1962. Hotchkiss also served as the head of Sigma Xi, and the head of the Kentucky-Tennessee branch of the Society of American Bacteriologists. In 1964, Hotchkiss retired from teaching but continued conducting research.

== Research ==
For her Ph.D., Hotchkiss investigated the positive and negative effects of cations on bacterial growth. She then worked with Selman Waksman to assess whether bacteria in sea water could grow and differences in data obtained from visual examination of bacteria compared to growth of bacteria on agar plates. Her marine research included investigations into the nitrogen cycle mediated by bacteria in seawater, and in 1946 she continued her interest in seawater bacteria when she reviewed Claude ZoBell's Marine Microbiology book. Her subsequent research examined hexosidases in Escherichia coli, and the bacterial community in Imhoff tanks that are used for processing sewage. Having become interested in fungi that cause disease while working in New York, she later published on the bacteria found in the human mouth, and biomedical research on histoplasmosis and Nocardia. After retiring from teaching, she focused on using a precision microtome to slice through bacterial cells and investigated the internal structure of bacteria.

== Selected publications ==
- Hotchkiss, Margaret (March 1923). "Studies on Salt Action Vi. The Stimulating and Inhibitive Effect of Certain Cations Upon Bacterial Growth". Journal of Bacteriology. 8 (2): 141–162. doi:10.1128/jb.8.2.141-162.1923. PMC 379008. PMID 16558991.
- Waksman, Selman A.; Hotchkiss, Margaret; Carey, Cornelia L. (1 October 1933). "Marine bacteria and their role in the cycle of life in the sea: II. bacteria concerned in the cycle of nitrogen in the sea". The Biological Bulletin. 65 (2): 137–167. doi:10.2307/1537170. ISSN 0006-3185. JSTOR 1537170.
- Waksman, Selman A.; Reuszer, H. W.; Carey, Cornelia L.; Hotchkiss, Margaret; Renn, C. E. (1933). "Studies on the Biology and Chemistry of the Gulf of Maine. III. Bacteriological Investigations of the Sea Water and Marine Bottoms". Biological Bulletin. 64 (2): 183–205. doi:10.2307/1537228. ISSN 0006-3185. JSTOR 1537228.
- Waksman, Selman A.; Hotchkiss, Margaret (1937). "On the oxidation of organic matter in marine sediments by bacteria". Journal of Marine Research. 78 (3): 151–166. doi:10.1357/002224020834162176 (inactive 12 July 2025). S2CID 240184203.
- Young, Barbara Burns; Hotchkiss, Margaret (1959-11-01). "Developmental morphology in the genus Nocardia". Mycopathologia et Mycologia Applicata. 11 (4): 297–310. doi:10.1007/BF02089505. ISSN 1573-0832. PMID 13846606. S2CID 2900587.

== Awards and honors ==
In 1957, Hotchkiss was elected a charter fellow of the American Academy of Microbiology. In 1959, she was named to Who's Who to honor her contribution to education. The University of Kentucky named her as the 1962-1963 distinguished professor. She was elected a fellow of the New York Academy of Sciences.
