= Elizabeth Bugie =

American biochemist

- Elizabeth Bugie in the lab
- Born: October 5, 1920
- Died: April 10, 2001 (aged 80)
- Education: Rutgers University; New Jersey College for Women
- Known for: Streptomycin
- Scientific career
- Thesis: Production of antibiotic substances by Aspergillus flavus and Chaetomium cochliodes (1944)
- Doctoral advisor: Selman Waksman

Elizabeth Bugie Gregory (October 5, 1920 – April 10, 2001) was an American biochemist who co-discovered Streptomycin, the first antibiotic against Mycobacterium tuberculosis in Selman Waksman laboratory at Rutgers University. Waksman went on to win the Nobel Prize for Medicine in 1952 and took the credit for the discovery.

== Early life and education ==
Elizabeth Bugie was born to Charles Bugie and Madeline Turbett. Bugie's father never studied beyond high school, and was committed to her education. He encouraged her to explore her curiosity, prompting her to be analytical and strong-willed.

Bugie studied microbiology at the New Jersey College for Women. She was a master's student at Rutgers University, working with Selman Waksman. Her master's thesis, Production of antibiotic substances by aspergillus flavus and chaetomium cochliodes, looked to optimise the production of flavicin and chaetomin.

== Career ==
Bugie worked on antimicrobials which could protect plants from Dutch elm disease. In 1944 Bugie, Waksman and Albert Schatz identified streptomycin in cultures of soil organisms, an antibiotic which was found to be active against Mycobacterium tuberculosis. Bugie was told that it was not important for her name to be on the patent as she would "one day get married and have a family". Waksman went on to win the Nobel Prize for Medicine in 1952 and took all the credit for the discovery of streptomycin. Waksman claimed that Bugie was more involved in the discovery than Schatz. Waksman also wrote articles about his discovery, rarely mentioning help he had received. Bugie was eventually awarded 0.2% of the royalties for streptomycin. After the discovery of streptomycin, Bugie worked on micromonosporin, a pigmented glycoprotein which was active against gram-positive bacteria. Bugie worked for Merck & Co., evaluating pyrazinoic acid and penicillin as antibiotics against mycobacterium tuberculosis. Bugie developed several antimicrobial substances.

== Personal life and death ==
After graduating, Bugie married Francis Joseph Gregory, who also worked as a microbiologist in the Waksman lab. Bugie eventually returned to academia to get a degree in library science after raising her family. Bugie's daughter, Eileen Gregory, is a microbiologist at Rollins College. and has stated that her mother "did research not for notoriety but for love of science". Bugie died on April 10, 2001. She died still not being on the patent for Streptomycin.

== Discovery of streptomycin ==
In the discovery of Streptomycin three people played a large role, namely Waksman, Schatz, and Bugie, later known as Elizabeth Gregory. They worked closely together to ultimately, as a group, discover streptomycin. Waksman historically received the most recognition.

When looking at the contributions made to the study and discovery of streptomycin, Bugie contributed as much, if not more than Schatz. However there was an uneven distribution in compensation that each contributor received. Schatz sued Waksman in order to get royalties, but when each got their share, Waksman received 10%, Schatz 3%, and all of the other members of the lab shared the last 7%, in which Bugie received 0.2%. When the patent was created, neither Waksman nor Schatz included Bugie, claiming that it would not matter because someday she would be married and have kids. When the patent was originally signed, Bugie signed an affidavit. In this affidavit, Bugie stated that she was informed about streptomycin by Waksman and Schatz and had no part in the discovery of streptomycin. Bugie was, however, later quoted by her daughters as having said that if the women's liberation movement had been present, she would have received credit towards the patent on streptomycin. Schatz explained "the fact that Waksman asked her to do the work was a testimonial to her talents and competence,"showing how much of an impact she actually made, and how little she was compensated for it.
