= Candicidin =

Pharmaceutic extract from Streptomyces griseus

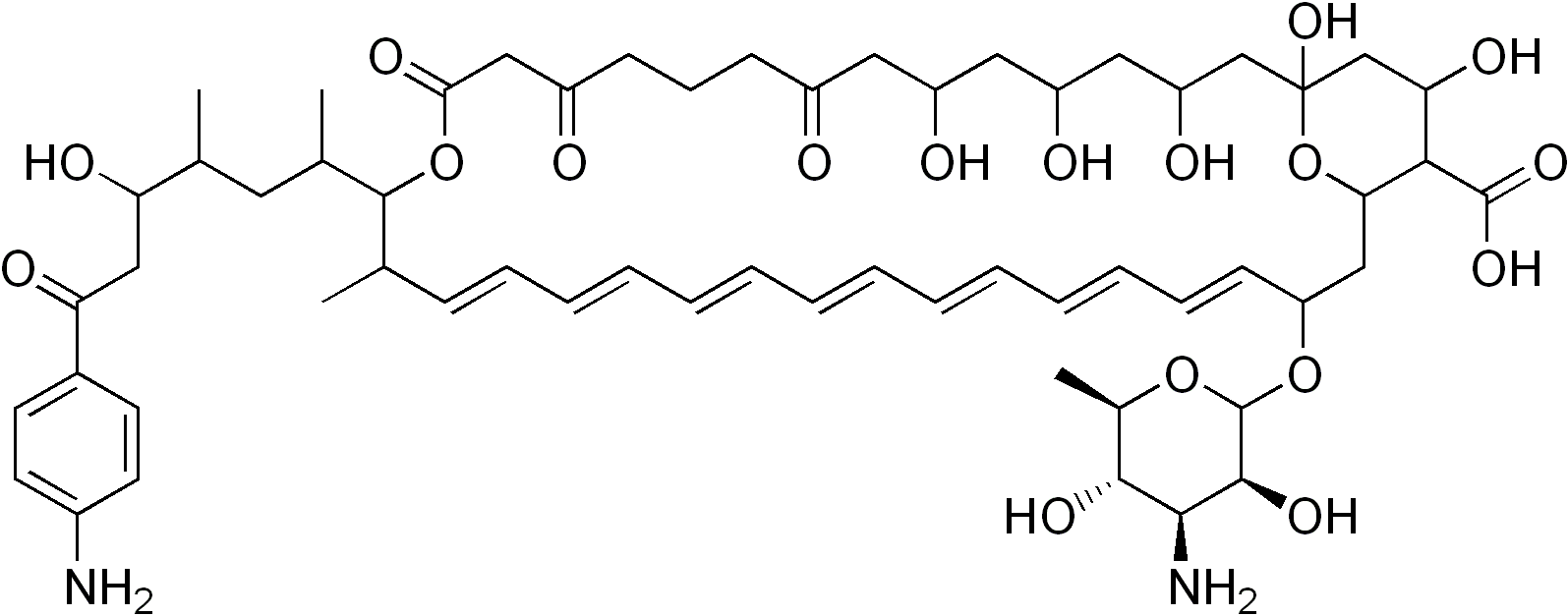

Clinical data
- ATC code: G01AA04 (WHO)

Identifiers
- IUPAC name: 33-[(3-Amino-3,6-dideoxy-D-mannopyranosyl)oxy]-17-[6-(4-aminophenyl)-4-hydroxy-1,3-dimethyl-6-oxohexyl]-1,3,5,7,37-pentahydroxy-18-methyl-9,13,15-trioxo-16,39-dioxabicyclo[33.3.1]nonatriaconta-19,21,23,25,27,29,31-heptaene-36-carboxylic acid
- CAS Number: 1403-17-4
- PubChem CID: 441142
- DrugBank: DB01152
- ChemSpider: 10128184
- UNII: 48N2IYJ202
- ChEMBL: ChEMBL1200647
- ECHA InfoCard: 100.014.330

Chemical and physical data
- Formula: C_{59}H_{84}N_{2}O_{18}
- Molar mass: 1109.317 g·mol^{−1}
- 3D model (JSmol): Interactive image
- SMILES: Nc1ccc(cc1)C(=O)CC(O)C(C)CC(C)C3OC(=O)CC(=O)CCCC(=O)CC(O)CC(O)CC(O)CC4(O)CC(O)C(C(=O)O)C(CC(OC2O[C@H](C)[C@@H](O)[C@H](N)[C@@H]2O)C=CC=CC=CC=CC=CC=CC=CC3C)O4
- InChI: InChI=1S/C59H84N2O18/c1-35-18-15-13-11-9-7-5-6-8-10-12-14-16-21-46(77-58-55(72)53(61)54(71)38(4)76-58)31-50-52(57(73)74)49(69)34-59(75,79-50)33-45(66)29-44(65)28-43(64)27-41(62)19-17-20-42(63)30-51(70)78-56(35)37(3)26-36(2)47(67)32-48(68)39-22-24-40(60)25-23-39/h5-16,18,21-25,35-38,43-47,49-50,52-56,58,64-67,69,71-72,75H,17,19-20,26-34,60-61H2,1-4H3,(H,73,74)/b6-5-,9-7-,10-8-,13-11-,14-12-,18-15-,21-16-/t35?,36?,37?,38-,43?,44?,45?,46?,47?,49?,50?,52?,53+,54-,55+,56?,58?,59?/m1/s1; Key:YKSVGLFNJPQDJE-WDANKXQLSA-N

Candicidin is an antifungal compound obtained from Streptomyces griseus. It is active against some fungi including Candida albicans. Candicidin is administered intravaginally in the treatment of vulvovaginal candidiasis.

This bioactive compound was named candicidin, because of its high activity on Candida albicans.
