= Greenleaf, Idaho =

- City
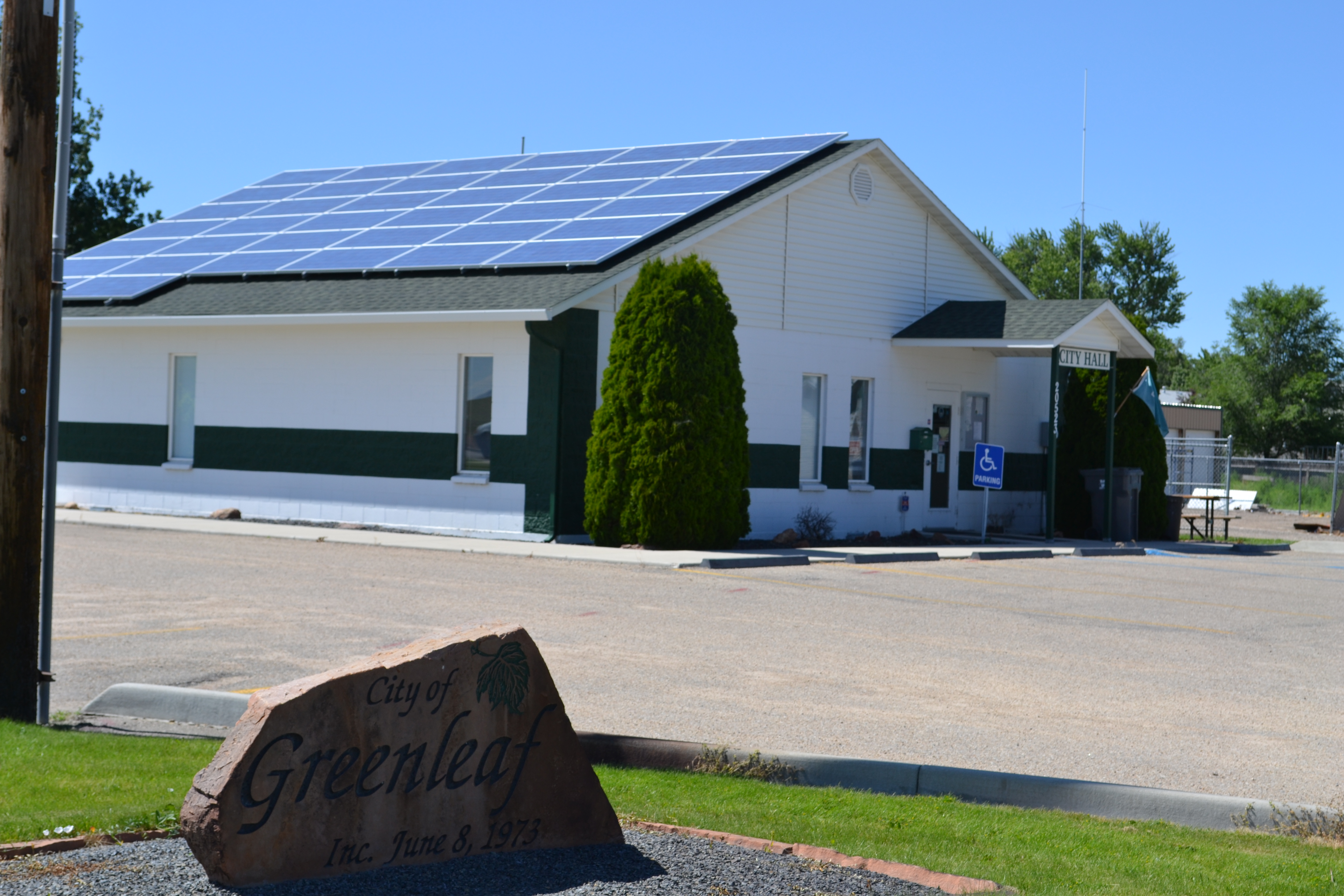
- Greenleaf City Hall, June 2011

- Location of Greenleaf in Canyon County, Idaho.
- Coordinates: 43°40′31″N 116°49′16″W
- Country: United States
- State: Idaho
- County: Canyon

Area
  - Total: 0.77 sq mi (2.00 km^{2})
  - Land: 0.77 sq mi (1.99 km^{2})
  - Water: 0 sq mi (0.00 km^{2})
- Elevation: 2,408 ft (734 m)

Population (2020)
  - Total: 812
  - Density: 1,060/sq mi (408/km^{2})
- Time zone: UTC-7 (Mountain (MST))
  - Summer (DST): UTC-6 (MDT)
- ZIP code: 83626
- Area code: 208
- FIPS code: 16-33490
- GNIS feature ID: 2410659
- Website: www.greenleaf-idaho.us

Greenleaf is a city in Canyon County, Idaho, United States. The population was 812 at the 2020 census. Greenleaf is part of the Boise-Nampa metropolitan area. The town was established by Quakers in the early-1900s and is named after Quaker poet and abolitionist John Greenleaf Whittier.

== Geography ==
According to the United States Census Bureau, the city has a total area of 0.73 square miles (1.89 km^{2}), all of it land.

== Demographics ==
Historical population
Census	Pop.	Note	%±
1980	663		—
1990	648		−2.3%
2000	862		33.0%
2010	846		−1.9%
2020	812		−4.0%
U.S. Decennial Census

=== 2010 census ===
As of the census of 2010, there were 846 people, 299 households, and 226 families residing in the city. The population density was 1,158.9 inhabitants per square mile (447.5/km^{2}). There were 316 housing units at an average density of 432.9 per square mile (167.1/km^{2}). The racial makeup of the city was 87.1% White, 0.4% African American, 0.5% Native American, 0.4% Asian, 9.6% from other races, and 2.1% from two or more races. Hispanic or Latino of any race were 19.4% of the population.

There were 299 households, of which 37.8% had children under the age of 18 living with them, 61.2% were married couples living together, 10.7% had a female householder with no husband present, 3.7% had a male householder with no wife present, and 24.4% were non-families. 19.7% of all households were made up of individuals, and 8.1% had someone living alone who was 65 years of age or older. The average household size was 2.83 and the average family size was 3.26.

The median age in the city was 39.6 years. 28.4% of residents were under the age of 18; 8.2% were between the ages of 18 and 24; 20.5% were from 25 to 44; 30.7% were from 45 to 64; and 12.2% were 65 years of age or older. The gender makeup of the city was 46.9% male and 53.1% female.

=== 2000 census ===
As of the census of 2000, there were 862 people, 277 households, and 219 families residing in the city. The population density was 1,190.1 inhabitants per square mile (459.5/km^{2}). There were 284 housing units at an average density of 392.1 per square mile (151.4/km^{2}). The racial makeup of the city was 74.59% White, 0.46% African American, 0.81% Native American, 0.81% Asian, 0.23% Pacific Islander, 22.39% from other races, and 0.70% from two or more races. Hispanic or Latino of any race were 23.32% of the population.

There were 277 households, out of which 46.9% had children under the age of 18 living with them, 63.9% were married couples living together, 10.8% had a female householder with no husband present, and 20.6% were non-families. 19.1% of all households were made up of individuals, and 10.5% had someone living alone who was 65 years of age or older. The average household size was 3.11 and the average family size was 3.57.

In the city, the population was spread out, with 35.7% under the age of 18, 7.9% from 18 to 24, 27.5% from 25 to 44, 20.8% from 45 to 64, and 8.1% who were 65 years of age or older. The median age was 31 years. For every 100 females, there were 94.1 males. For every 100 females age 18 and over, there were 85.9 males.

The median income for a household in the city was $37,375, and the median income for a family was $45,313. Males had a median income of $26,538 versus $22,115 for females. The per capita income for the city was $15,406. About 9.3% of families and 13.3% of the population were below the poverty line, including 17.8% of those under age 18 and 14.0% of those age 65 or over.

== Education ==
It is in the Vallivue School District 139.

Greenleaf Friends Academy is in Greenleaf.

Residents of Canyon County are in the area (and the taxation zone) for College of Western Idaho.

== See also ==
- List of cities in Idaho
