= Ferrichrome =

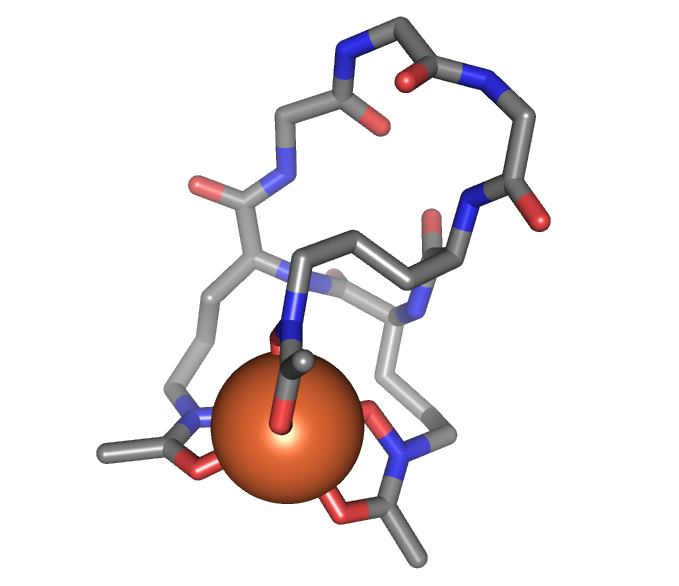
- Ferrichrome (sticks) bound to an iron atom (orange)

Names
- IUPAC name N-[3-[4,16-bis[3-[acetyl(oxido)amino]propyl]-2,5,8,11,14,17-hexaoxo-3,6,9,12,15,18-hexazacyclooctadec-1-yl]propyl]-N-oxidoacetamide; iron(3+)

Identifiers
CAS Number	15630-64-5
3D model (JSmol)	Interactive image
ChemSpider	26333219
ECHA InfoCard	100.036.081
EC Number	239-706-0
PubChem CID	27424
UNII	G884EC9X73
CompTox Dashboard (EPA)	DTXSID50911697 DTXSID40935423, DTXSID50911697
- InChI: InChI=1S/C27H42N9O12.Fe/c1-16(37)34(46)10-4-7-19-25(43)30-14-23(41)28-13-22(40)29-15-24(42)31-20(8-5-11-35(47)17(2)38)26(44)33-21(27(45)32-19)9-6-12-36(48)18(3)39;/h19-21H,4-15H2,1-3H3,(H,28,41)(H,29,40)(H,30,43)(H,31,42)(H,32,45)(H,33,44);/q-3;+3 Key: GGUNGDGGXMHBMJ-UHFFFAOYSA-N
- SMILES: CC(=O)N(CCCC1C(=O)NC(C(=O)NC(C(=O)NCC(=O)NCC(=O)NCC(=O)N1)CCCN(C(=O)C)[O-])CCCN(C(=O)C)[O-])[O-].[Fe+3]

Properties
Chemical formula	C_{27}H_{42}FeN_{9}O_{12}
Molar mass	740.529 g·mol^{−1}
- Except where otherwise noted, data are given for materials in their standard state (at 25 °C [77 °F], 100 kPa). verify (what is ?) Infobox references

Ferrichrome is a cyclic hexa-peptide that forms a complex with iron atoms. It is a siderophore composed of three glycine and three modified ornithine residues with hydroxamate groups [-N(OH)C(=O)C-]. The 6 oxygen atoms from the three hydroxamate groups bind Fe(III) in near perfect octahedral coordination.

Ferrichrome was first isolated in 1952, and has been found to be produced by fungi of the genera Aspergillus, Ustilago, and Penicillium. However, at the time there was no understanding regarding its involvement and contribution to iron transport. It was not until 1957 because of Joe Neilands' work, where he first noted that Ferrichrome was able to act as an iron transport agent.

== Biological function ==
Ferrichrome is a siderophore, which are metal chelating agents that have a low molecular mass and are produced by microorganisms and plants growing under low iron conditions. The main function of siderophores is to chelate ferric iron (Fe^{3+}) from insoluble minerals from the environment and make it available for microbial and plant cells. Iron is important in biological functions as it acts as a catalyst in enzymatic processes, as well as for electron transfer, DNA and RNA synthesis, and oxygen metabolism. Although iron is the fourth most abundant element in the Earth's crust, bioavailability of iron in aerobic environments is low due to formation of insoluble ferric hydroxides. Under iron limitation, bacteria scavenge for ferric iron (Fe^{3+}) by up-regulating the secretion of siderophores in order to meet their nutritional requirements. Recent studies have shown that ferrichrome has been used as a tumor- suppressive molecule produced by the bacterium Lacticaseibacillus casei. The study from the Department of Medicine and Asahikawa Medical University, suggests that ferrichrome has a greater tumor-suppressive effect than other drugs currently used to fight colon cancer, including cisplatin and 5-fluoro-uracil. Ferrichrome also had less of an effect on non-cancerous intestinal cells than the two previously mentioned cancer fighting drugs. It was determined that ferrichrome activated the C-Jun N-terminal kinases, which induced apoptosis. The induction of apoptosis by ferrichrome is reduced by the inhibition of the c-jun N-terminal kinase signaling pathway.

== Uptake ==
Iron is essential for the most important biological processes such as DNA and RNA synthesis, glycolysis, energy generation, nitrogen fixation and photosynthesis, therefore uptake of iron from the environment and transport into the organism are critical life processes for almost all organisms. The problem is when environmental iron is exposed to oxygen it is mineralized to its insoluble ferric oxy hydroxide form which can not be transported into the cells and therefore is not available for use by the cell. To overcome this, bacteria, fungi and some plants synthesize siderophores, and secrete it into an extracellular environment where binding of iron can occur. Microbes make their own type of siderophore so that they are not competing with other organisms for iron uptake. For example, Saccharomyces cerevisiae is a species of yeast that can uptake the iron bound siderophore through transporters of the ARN family. [Fe^{3+}( siderophore)]^{(n-3)-} binds to a receptor-transporter on the cell surface and then is up taken. The exact mechanism how iron enters the cell using these transporters is not understood, but it known that once it enters the cell it accumulates in the cytosol. In saccharomyces cerevisiae, ferrichrome is specifically taken up by ARN1P as it has 2 binding sites and ferrichrome can the higher affinity site through endocytosis. Ferrichrome chelates stay stable in the cell and allow for iron storage, but can be easily mobilized to meet the metabolic needs of the cell.

The removal of Fe^{3+} occurs through the reduction of Fe^{3+} to Fe^{2+}. The reduction strategy helps in making the iron more aqueous soluble, and allows the iron to become more bioavailable in order for uptake to occur. This is because the Fe^{2+} product is not able to mineralize like the Fe^{3+}, as it does not bind significantly to the chelate ligand that is designed to bind Fe^{3+}. In addition to this, the Fe^{3+} product can also release Fe^{2+} from the chelate ligands that was designed to bind Fe^{3+}. Fe^{2+} has little to no affinity towards the siderophore ligand and this removal is necessary for use and storage. This is because Fe^{2+} is an intermediate acid, therefore it is not able to bind significantly to the siderophore chelate ligands and can only bind with a much lower affinity. Whereas, Fe^{3+} is a hard base and can bind to the siderophore chelate ligands with a much higher affinity. The Fe^{3+} siderophore complexes are taken up into the bacterial membrane by active transport mechanisms. This uptake process is able to recognize different structural features of the siderophores and transport the Fe^{3+} complexes into the periplasm.

== Siderophore binding ==
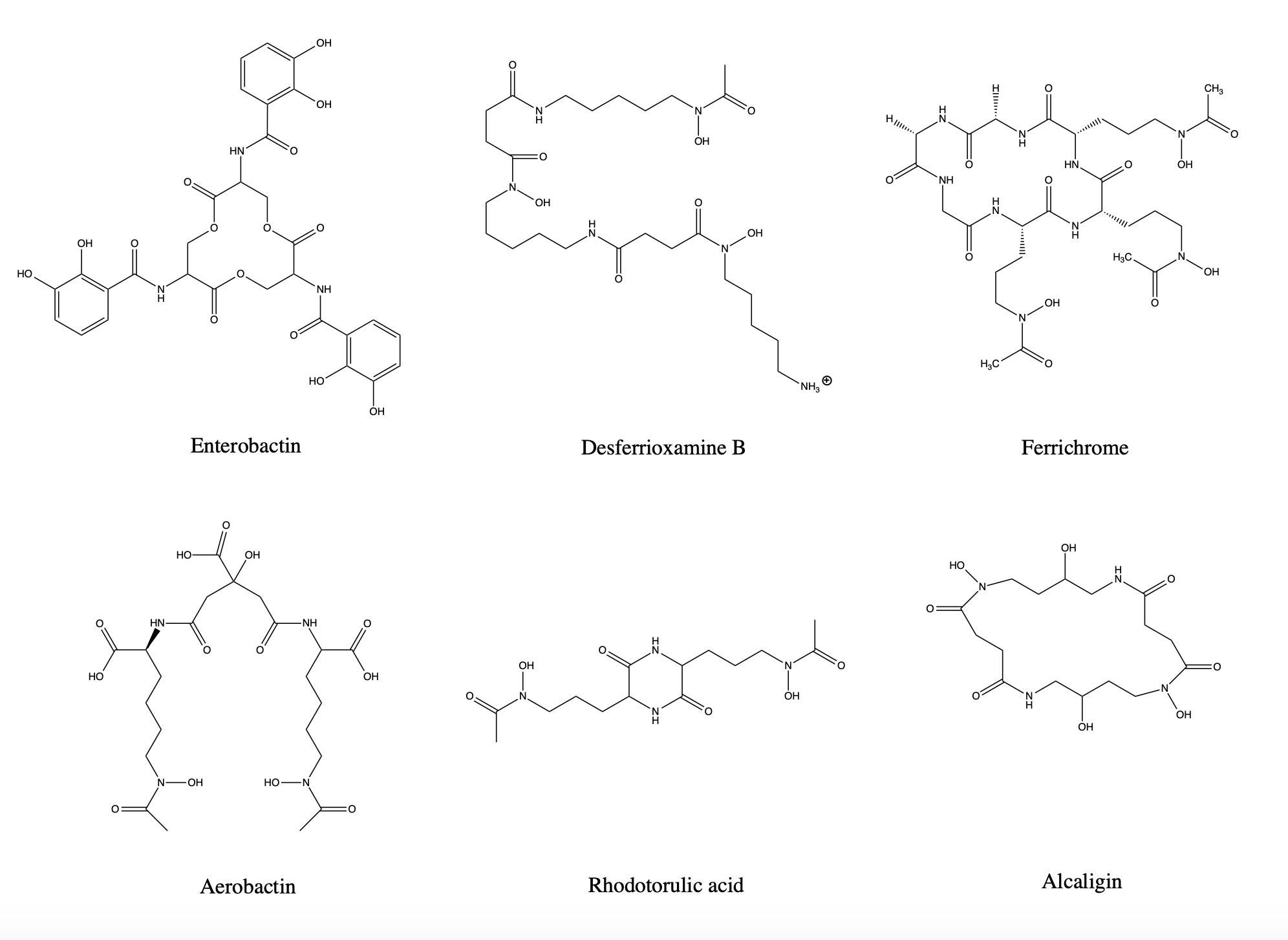
Chemical structures of various siderophores

The main types of siderophores have catecholate, hydroxamate, and carboxylate coordinating ligands. An example of a catecholate siderophore includes enterobactin. Examples of hydroxamate siderophores include desferrioxamine, ferrichrome, aerobactin, rhodotorullic acid, and alcaligin. Aerobactin is a carboxylate siderophore as well. The triscatecholate siderophore, enterobactin, has a higher binding affinity of logβ_{110} = 49 to ferric iron compared to Ferrichrome, which has a binding affinity of logβ_{110} = 29.07. Therefore, it would outcompete with the other siderophore and bind more of the available environmental Fe^{3+}. It does not bind other metals in high concentration because of its high Fe^{3+} specificity. The trishydroxamate siderophore, desferrioxamine, has a binding affinity of logβ_{110} = 30.6 and has a lower binding affinity compared to Ferrichrome. Therefore, the desferrioxamine siderophore can also outcompete Ferrichrome, and bind more of the available environmental Fe^{3+}. However, the bishydroxamate siderophores aerobactin (logβ_{110} = 22.5), rhodotorullic acid (logβ_{110} =21.55), and alcaligin (logβ_{110} = 23.5) will not be able to outcompete with the triscatecholate and trishydroxamate siderophores, since they do not have high Fe^{3+} specificity. Therefore, they are not able to bind more of the available environmental Fe^{3+}.

Iron in its trivalent state has an electron configuration of d^{5}, therefore, its complexes are preferentially hexacoordinate, quasi octahedral. In terms of the HSAB principle, ferric siderophores have donor atoms that are mainly oxygen and rarely heterocyclic nitrogen. This is because of the ferric ion being a hard Lewis acid, and the ferric iron therefore binds more strongly with a hard anionic oxygen donor.

== FhuA uptake mechanism ==
E. coli has a receptor protein called FhuA (ferric Hydroxamate).

FhuA's is an energy-coupled transporter and receptor. It is a part of the integral outer membrane proteins and works alongside an energy transducing protein TonB. It is involved in the uptake of iron in complex with ferrichrome by binding and transporting ferrichrome-iron across the cell's outer membrane.

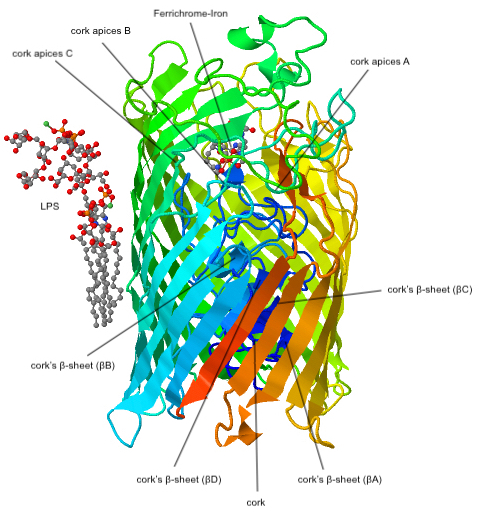
FhuA from E. Coli in complex with bound ferrichrome-iron

The green ribbons represent β-barrel wall that is 69Å long x 40-45Å diameter that represents the C-terminus residues. It has 22 antiparallel β strands. The blue ribbon in the center is a "cork" which is a distinct domain for the N-terminus residues.

FhuA has L4 strand and its role is to transport ferrichrome into the β-barrel wall. The ferrichrome complex then binds tightly to both the β-barrel wall and the "cork". As a result, these binding triggers two key conformation changes to iron-ferrichrome complex to transfer energy to the cork. This energy transfer results in subsequent conformational changes that transport iron-ferrichrome to the periplasmic pocket which signal a ligand loaded status of the receptor. These subtle shifts disrupt the binding of iron-ferrichrome to the cork which then allows the permeation of the ferrichrome-iron to a putative channel-forming region. The inner wall of the β-barrel provides a series of weak binding sites to pull ferrichrome along. FhuD is a high affinity binding protein in the periplasmic pocket that also aids in unidirectional transport across the cell envelope.

== See also ==
- Ferrichrome A
