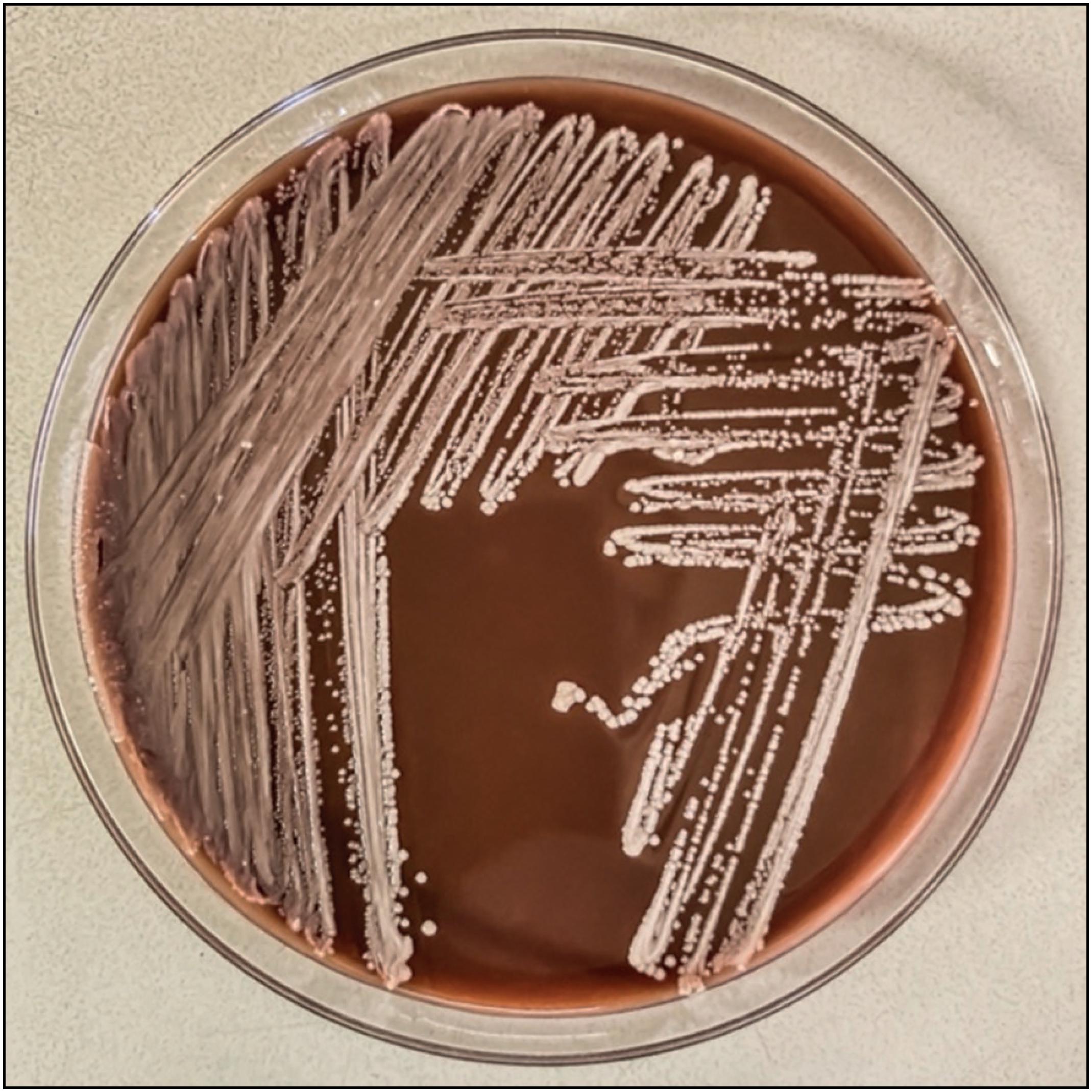
- Streptomyces griseus colonies on chocolate agar

Scientific classification
- Domain: Bacteria
- Kingdom: Bacillati
- Phylum: Actinomycetota
- Class: Actinomycetes
- Order: Streptomycetales
- Family: Streptomycetaceae
- Genus: Streptomyces
- Species: S. griseus

Binomial name
- Streptomyces griseus (Krainsky 1914); Waksman and Henrici 1948

Synonyms
- "Actinomyces acrimycini" Preobrazhenskaya et al. 1957; "Actinomyces fimicarius" Duché 1934; "Actinomyces globisporus subsp. flavofuscus" Kudrina 1957; "Actinomyces griseus" Krainsky 1914; "Actinomyces setonii" Millard and Burr 1926; Streptomyces acrimycini (Preobrazhenskaya et al. 1957) Pridham et al. 1958 (Approved Lists 1980); Streptomyces argenteolus Tresner et al. 1961 (Approved Lists 1980); Streptomyces baarnensis Pridham et al. 1958 (Approved Lists 1980); Streptomyces caviscabies Goyer et al. 1996; Streptomyces erumpens Calot and Cercós 1963 (Approved Lists 1980); Streptomyces fimicarius (Duché 1934) Waksman and Henrici 1948 (Approved Lists 1980); Streptomyces flavofuscus (Kudrina 1957) Preobrazhenskaya 1986; Streptomyces globisporus subsp. flavofuscus (Kudrina 1957) Pridham et al. 1958 (Approved Lists 1980); Streptomyces setonii (Millard and Burr 1926) Waksman 1953 (Approved Lists 1980)

= Streptomyces griseus =

Species of bacterium

Streptomyces griseus is a species of bacteria in the genus Streptomyces commonly found in soil. A few strains have been also reported from deep-sea sediments. It is a Gram-positive bacterium with high GC content. Along with most other streptomycetes, S. griseus strains are well known producers of antibiotics and other such commercially significant secondary metabolites. These strains are known to be producers of 32 different structural types of bioactive compounds. Streptomycin, the first antibiotic ever reported from a bacterium, comes from strains of S. griseus. Recently, the whole genome sequence of one of its strains had been completed.

The taxonomic history of S. griseus and its phylogenetically related strains has been turbulent. S. griseus was first described in 1914 by Krainsky, who called the species Actinomyces griseus. The name was changed in 1948 by Waksman and Henrici to Streptomyces griseus. The interest in these strains stems from their ability to produce streptomycin, a compound which demonstrated significant bactericidal activity against organisms such as Yersinia pestis (the causative agent of plague) and Mycobacterium tuberculosis (the causative agent of tuberculosis). Streptomycin was discovered in the laboratory of Selman Waksman, although his PhD student Albert Schatz probably did most of the work on these strains of bacteria and the antibiotic they produce.

== Taxonomy ==
Streptomyces is the largest genus of the Actinomycetota and is the type genus of the family Streptomycetaceae. These are Gram-positive bacteria with high GC content and are characterised by a complex secondary metabolism. They produce over two-thirds of the clinically useful antibiotics of natural origin. Streptomycetes are found predominantly in soil and in decaying vegetation, and most produce spores. Streptomycetes are noted for their distinct "earthy" odor which results from production of a volatile metabolite, geosmin.

Like other streptomycetes, S. griseus has a high GC content in its genome, with an average of 72.2%. The species was first classified within the genus Streptomyces by Waksman and Henrici in 1948. The taxonomy of S. griseus and its evolutionarily related strains have been a considerable source of confusion for microbial systematists. 16S rRNA gene sequence data have been used to recognise the related strains, and are called S. griseus 16S rRNA gene clade. The strains of this clade have homogeneous phenotypic properties but show substantial genotypic heterogenecity based on genomic data. Several attempts are still made to solve this issue using techniques such as DNA:DNA homology and multilocus sequence typing. A whole genome sequence was carried out on the IFO 13350 strain of S. griseus.

== Physiology and morphology ==
S. griseus and its related strains have recently been shown to be alkaliphilic, i.e., they grow best at alkaline pH values. Although these organisms grow in a wide pH range (from 5 to 11), they show a growth optimum at pH 9. They produce grey spore masses and grey-yellow reverse pigments when they grow as colonies. The spores have smooth surfaces and are arranged as straight chains.

== Ecology ==
S. griseus strains have been isolated from various ecologies, including stell waste tips, rhizosphere, deep sea sediments and coastal beach and dune sand systems. Recent studies have indicated the strains of S. griseus might be undergoing ecology-specific evolution, giving rise to genetic variation with the specific ecology, termed ecovars.

== Antibiotic production ==
Interest in the genus Streptomyces for antibiotics came after the discovery of the antibiotic streptomycin in a S. griseus strain in 1943. The discovery of streptomycin, an antituberculosis antibiotic, earned Selman Waksman the Nobel Prize in 1952. The award was not without controversy, since it excluded the nomination of Albert Schatz, who is now recognized as one of the major co-inventors of streptomycin. The strains of this species are now known to be rich sources of antibiotics and to produce 32 different structural types of commercially significant secondary metabolites. Furthermore, the genomic studies have revealed a single strain of S. griseus IFO 13350 has the capacity to produce 34 different secondary metabolites.

== Etymology ==
By 1943, Albert Schatz, a PhD student working in Selman Waksman's laboratory, had isolated streptomycin from Streptomyces griseus (from the Greek strepto- ("twisted") + mykēs ["fungus"] and the Latin griseus, "gray").

== The official New Jersey state microbe ==
S. griseus was designated the official New Jersey state microbe in legislation submitted by Senator Sam Thompson (R-12) in May 2017 and Assemblywoman Annette Quijano (D-20) in June 2017.

The organism was chosen because it is a New Jersey native that made unique contributions to healthcare and scientific research worldwide. A strain of S. griseus that produced the antibiotic streptomycin was discovered in New Jersey in "heavily manured field soil" from the New Jersey Agricultural Experimental Station by Albert Schatz in 1943. Streptomycin is noteworthy because it is the first significant antibiotic discovered after penicillin, the first systemic antibiotic discovered in America, the first antibiotic active against tuberculosis, and the first-line treatment for plague. Moreover, New Jersey was the home of Selman Waksman, who was awarded the Nobel Prize in Physiology or Medicine for his systematic studies of antibiotic production by S. griseus and other soil microbes.

The bill, S1729, was signed into law by NJ Governor Phil Murphy May 2019.

== See also ==
- CRT (genetics), gene cluster responsible for the biosynthesis of carotenoids
