= Siderocalin =

Mammalian lipocalin-type protein

Neutrophil gelatinase-associated lipocalin/epididymal-specific lipocalin-12

Identifiers
- Aliases: LCN2/LCN12IPR003087Siderocalin
- External IDs: GeneCards:
Orthologs
Databases	n/a
Species	Human	Mouse
Entrez	n/a	n/a
Ensembl	n/a	n/a
UniProt	n a	n/a
RefSeq (mRNA)	n/a	n/a
RefSeq (protein)	n/a	n/a
Location (UCSC)	n/a	n/a
PubMed search	n/a	n/a
- Wikidata
View/Edit Human

Siderocalin (Scn), lipocalin-2, NGAL, 24p3 is a mammalian lipocalin-type protein that can prevent iron acquisition by pathogenic bacteria by binding siderophores, which are iron-binding chelators made by microorganisms. Iron serves as a key nutrient in host-pathogen interactions, and pathogens can acquire iron from the host organism via synthesis and release siderophores such as enterobactin. Siderocalin is a part of the mammalian defence mechanism and acts as an antibacterial agent. Crystallographic studies of Scn demonstrated that it includes a calyx, a ligand-binding domain that is lined with polar cationic groups. Central to the siderophore/siderocalin recognition mechanism are hybrid electrostatic/cation-pi interactions. To evade the host defences, pathogens evolved to produce structurally varied siderophores that would not be recognized by siderocalin, allowing the bacteria to acquire iron.

== Iron requirements of host organisms ==
Organisms require iron for a variety of chemical reactions. Although iron can be found throughout the biosphere, free ferric iron forms insoluble hydroxides at physiological pH, limiting its accessibility in aerobic conditions to living organisms. In order to preserve homeostasis, organisms have evolved specific protein networks, with proteins and receptors translated in accordance with intracellular iron levels. Export and import are supplemented by a cycling process between the ferrous Fe(II) available in the reducing environment of the cell, and ferric Fe(III) found primarily under aerobic conditions. The iron acquisition mechanisms of pathogenic bacteria demonstrate the role of iron as a key component at the interface between pathogens and hosts.

== Lipocalin family of iron binding proteins ==
The lipocalin family of binding proteins are produced by the immune system and sequester ferric siderophore complexes from the siderophore receptors of bacteria. The lipocalin family of binding proteins typically have a conserved eight-stranded β-barrel fold with a calyx binding site, which are lined with positively charged amino acid residues, allowing for binding interactions with siderophores.

== Clinical significance ==
=== Mycobacterial infections ===
The lipocalin siderocalin is found in neutrophil granules, uterine secretions, and at particularly high levels in serum during bacterial infection. Upon infection, pathogens use siderophores to capture iron from the host organism. This strategy is, however, complicated by the human protein siderocalin, which can sequester siderophores, and prevent their use by pathogenic bacteria as iron delivery agents. This effect has been demonstrated by studies with siderocalin-knock-out mice, which are more sensitive to infections under iron-limiting conditions.

=== Mycobacterial virulence ===
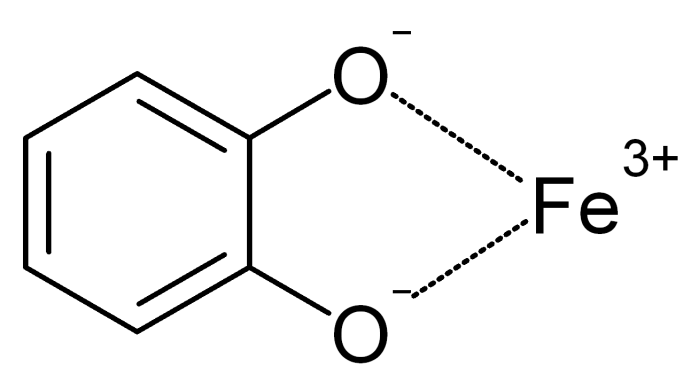
Catecholate-iron binding. A typical complex would exhibit three such interactions.

Siderophores are iron chelators, allowing organisms to acquire iron from their environment. In the case of pathogens, iron can be acquired from the host organism. Siderophores and ferric iron can associate to form stable complexes. Siderophores bind iron using a variety of ligands, most commonly as α-hydroxycarboxylates (e.g. citrate), catecholates, and hydroxamates. As a defence mechanism, siderocalin can substitute ferric bis-catechol complexes (formed under physiological conditions) with a third catechol, in order to achieve a hexacoordinate ferric complex, resulting in higher affinity binding.

== As a mediator of mammalian iron transport ==
Mammalian siderophores, specifically catechols, can be found in the human gut and in siderophores, such as enterobactin, and serve as iron-binding moieties. Catechol resembling molecules can act as iron ligands in the cell and in systematic circulation, allowing siderocalin to bind to the iron-catechol complex. Catechols can be bound by siderocalin, in the form of free ligands, or in the iron complex. 24p3 is a vertebrate lipocalin-2 receptor which allows for import of the ferric siderophore complex into mammalian cells. During kidney embryogenesis, siderocalin mediated iron transport occurs, as iron concentration has to be highly controlled in order to restrict inflammation. Following secretion by neutrophils, siderocalin can bind to pathogenic siderophores, such as bacillibactin, and prevent siderophore trafficking. Siderocalin has been linked with various cellular processes apart from iron transport, including apoptosis, cellular differentiation, tumorigenesis, and metastasis.

== Structure ==
The avian orthologs of siderocalin (Q83 and Ex-FABP) and NGAL (neutrophil gelatinase-associated lipocalin-2) contain calyces with positively charged lysine and arginine side chains. These side chains interact via cation-pi and coulombic interactions with the negatively charged siderophores that contain aromatic catecholate groups. Crystallographic studies of siderocalin have shown that the ligand binding domain of Scn, known as the calyx, is shallow and broad, and is lined with polar cationic groups from the three positively charged residues of Arg81, Lys125, and Lys134. Scn can also bind non-ferric complexes and has been identified as a potential transporter for heavy actinide ions. Scn crystal structures containing heavy metals (thorium, plutonium, americium, curium, and californium) have been obtained. Scn has been found as a monomer, homo-dimer, or trimer in human plasma. The siderocalin fold is exceptionally stable. The calyx is structurally stable and rigid, and conformational change does not typically occur upon a change in pH, ionic strength, or ligand binding.

=== Binding pocket ===
The structural stability of the calyx has been attributed to the three binding pockets within the calyx that sterically limit which ligands are compatible with siderocalin. The Scn calyx can accommodate three aromatic rings of the catecholate moieties, in the three available binding pockets. Solid-state and solution structural results demonstrated that bacteria-derived enterobactin is bound to the binding pocket of Scn, allowing for Scn to be involved in the acute immune response to bacterial infection. One method by which pathogens can circumvent immunity mechanisms is by modifying the siderophore chemical structure to prevent interaction with Scn. One example is the addition of glucose molecules to the enterobactin backbone of salmochelin (C-glucosylated enterobactin) in order to increase the hydrophilicity and bulkiness of a siderophore and inhibit binding to Scn.

== Binding interactions ==
Enterobactin, a catecholate siderophore

Siderophores are typically bound to siderocalin with subnanomolar affinities, and interact with siderocalin specifically. The Kd value of the siderocalin/siderophore interaction, measured by fluorescence quenching (Kd= 0.4 nM), indicates that siderocalin can capture siderophores with high affinity. This Kd value is similar to that of the FepA bacterial receptor (Kd= 0.3 nM). Siderophore/siderocalin binding is directed by electrostatic interactions. Specifically, the mechanism involves hybrid electrostatic and cation-pi interactions in the positively charged protein calyx. The siderophore is positioned in the centre of the siderocalin calyx, and is associated with multiple direct polar interactions. Structural analysis of the siderocalin/siderophore interaction has shown that the siderophore is accompanied by a poor and diffuse quality of electron density, with the majority of the ligand exposed to the solvent when the siderophore is fit in the calyx. Siderocalin typically does not bind hydroxamate-based siderophores because these substrates do not have the necessary aromatic electronic structure for cation-pi interactions. In order to acquire iron in the presence of siderocalin, pathogenic bacteria utilize several siderophores that do not bind to siderocalin, or structurally modify siderophores to inhibit siderocalin binding. Siderocalin can bind soluble siderophores of mycobacteria, including carboxymycobactins. In vivo studies have shown that the binding interactions between carboxymycobactin and siderocalin serve to protect the host organism from mycobacterial infections, with siderocalin inhibiting mycobacterial iron acquisition. Siderocalin can sequester ferric carboxymycobactins by employing a polyspecific recognition mechanism. The siderophore/siderocalin recognition mechanism primarily involves hybrid electrostatic/cation-pi interactions. The fatty acid tails of carboxymycobactin reside in a 'tail-in' or 'tail-out' conformation within pocket 2. The 'tail-in' conformation of the fatty acid chain lengths introduces a significant interaction between the calyx and the ligand, increasing the affinity of the siderocalin calyx and carboxymycobactin. The fatty acid tails of short lengths have a correspondingly less favorable binding to siderocalin, and cannot maintain the necessary interaction with the binding pocket. Since lipocalin-2 cannot bind the long fatty acid chain carboxymycobactins of mycobacteria, it is apparent that a number of pathogens have evolved to avoid the activity of lipocalin-2.

== Recognition mechanism ==
Electrostatic interaction play a key role in the recognition mechanism of siderophores by siderocalin. The binding of the siderophore and the siderocalin binding pocket is primarily directed by cation-pi interactions, with the positively charged binding pocket of siderocalin attracting the negatively charged complex. A structural factor involved in the siderocalin mediated recognition mechanism of phenolate/catecholate-type siderophores includes a backbone linker which allows for siderocalin to interact with different phenolate/catecholate siderophores. While siderocalin recognition is minimally affected by the substitution of different metals, methylating the three catecholate rings of enterobactin can impede the recognition of siderocalin. A strategy used by pathogens to overcome immune response is the production of siderophores that will not be recognized by siderocalin. For example, siderocalin cannot recognize the siderophores of the C-glucosylated analog of enterobactin, as the donor groups are glycosylated, introducing steric interactions at the position 5-carbons of the catechol groups.

== History ==
The requirement for iron by humans and pathogens has been known for many years. The link between iron and mycobactins, iron-chelating growth factors from mycobacteria, was first made in the 1960s. At the time, interest was growing in resolving an application of mycobactins as target molecules for a rational anti-tuberculosis agent. Experiments in the 1960s and 1970s demonstrated that iron deficiency in mycobacteria was the cause of 'anaemic' cells. The majority of the genes and systems necessary for high affinity iron acquisition have been identified in pathogenic and saprophytic mycobacteria. These genes encode proteins for iron storage, uptake of ferric-siderophores, and heme. Humans have evolved a defense for siderophore-mediated iron acquisition by developing siderocalin. To combat this, various pathogens have evolved siderophores that can evade siderocalin recognition. Siderocalin has been shown to bind to siderophores and inhibit iron acquisition, and prevent the growth of Mycobacterium tuberculosis in extracellular cultures; however, the effect of siderocalin on this pathogen within macrophages remains unclear.

== See also ==
- LCN2
- LCN1
- Animal pathogens
- Mycobacteria
