= Mugineic-acid 3-dioxygenase =

Identifiers
- EC no.: 1.14.11.25

Databases
- IntEnz: IntEnz view
- BRENDA: BRENDA entry
- ExPASy: NiceZyme view
- KEGG: KEGG entry
- MetaCyc: metabolic pathway
- PRIAM: profile
- PDB structures: RCSB PDB PDBe PDBsum
Search
- PMC: articles
- PubMed: articles
- NCBI: proteins

Mugineic-acid 3-dioxygenase (EC 1.14.11.25, IDS2) is an enzyme with systematic name mugineic acid,2-oxoglutarate:oxygen oxidoreductase (3-hydroxylating). This enzyme catalyses the following chemical reaction

mugineic acid
Fe(IV)=O
Fe(II)
3-epi-3-hydroxymugineic acid

It can also catalyse the related reaction:

2'-deoxymugineic acid
Fe(IV)=O
Fe(II)
3-epi-3-hydroxy-2'-deoxymugineic acid

Mugineic acid is an amino acid excreted by some graminaceous (grassy) plants under conditions of iron deficiency as part of a strategy of solubilizing Fe(III) from the root environment for uptake by the plant. Mugineic acid is closely related to its biochemical precursor, nicotianamine, and to a number of other compounds that also have been identified as phytosiderophores in graminaceous plants: 3-hydroxymugineic acid, 2'-deoxymugineic acid, avenic acid, and distichonic acid.

The effectiveness of mugineic acid under iron-deficient conditions is dependent not only upon the iron chelating properties of the Fe-mugineic acid complex itself but also upon the presence of a plant membrane carrier that recognizes and absorbs the Fe-mugineic acid complex almost exclusively.

== Mechanism ==
The enzyme is a 2-oxoglutarate-dependent oxygenase, which are non-heme iron proteins with ferryl active site where Fe(IV)=O is the species that transfers its oxygen to the substrate.

The mechanism requires 2-oxoglutaric acid to activate the iron oxygen complex, and this gives succinic acid and carbon dioxide when the second atom of the molecular oxygen is removed.

2-oxoglutaric acid
[O]
CO_{2}
succinic acid
