= Subhadeep Chatterjee =

Indian molecular biologist

- Born: West Bengal, India
- Education: Guru Nanak Dev University; Centre for Cellular and Molecular Biology; University of California, Berkeley
- Known for: Studies on plant-microbe interactions
- Awards: 2017/18 N-BIOS Prize; 2020: Shanti Swarup Bhatnagar Prize
- Scientific career
- Fields: Molecular biology
- Workplaces: Centre for DNA Fingerprinting and Diagnostics
- Doctoral advisor: Ramesh V. Sonti; Steven E. Lindow

Subhadeep Chatterjee is an Indian molecular biologist and a scientist at the Centre for DNA Fingerprinting and Diagnostics (CDFD). A member of Guha Research Conference, he is known for his studies on plant-microbe interactions and heads the Lab of Plant-Microbe Interactions at CDFD where he hosts several researchers.

Chatterjee, after earning an M.Sc. in Biotechnology from Guru Nanak Dev University, Amritsar, did his doctoral research at the laboratory of Ramesh Venkata Sonti of the Centre for Cellular and Molecular Biology (CCMB), Hyderabad. His post-doctoral work was at the laboratory of Steven E. Lindow at the University of California, Berkeley. He is known to have carried out extensive research on plant- microbe interaction system and has published a number of articles, (Note: Please see Selected bibliography section) ResearchGate, an online repository of scientific articles has listed 52 of them. The Department of Biotechnology of the Government of India awarded him the National Bioscience Award for Career Development, one of the highest Indian science awards, for his contributions to biosciences, in 2017/18.

Subhadeep Chatterjee was awarded the Shanti Swarup Bhatnagar Prize for Science and Technology, the highest science award in India, for the year 2020 in biological sciences category.

== Selected bibliography ==
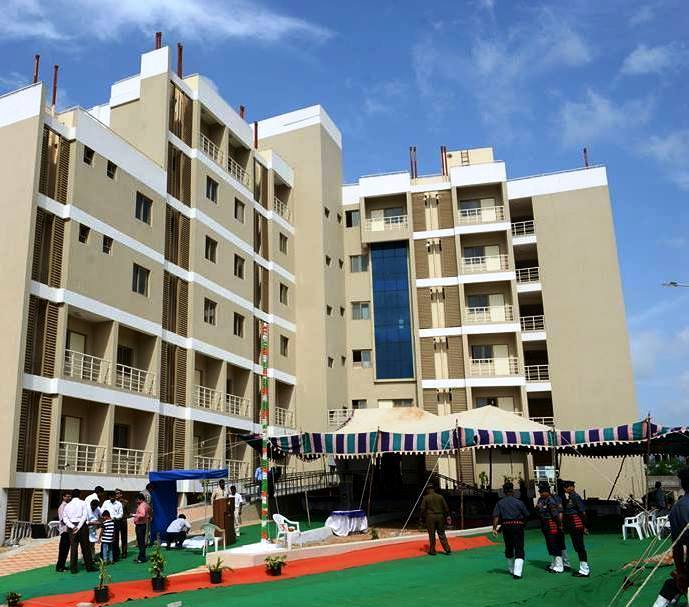
CDFD Uppal Campus

- Verma, Raj Kumar; Samal, Biswajit; Chatterjee, Subhadeep (2018). "Xanthomonas oryzae pv. oryzae chemotaxis components and chemoreceptor Mcp2 are involved in the sensing of constituents of xylem sap and contribute to the regulation of virulence-associated functions and entry into rice". Molecular Plant Pathology. 19 (11): 2397–2415. Bibcode:2018MolPP..19.2397K. doi:10.1111/mpp.12718. ISSN 1364-3703. PMC 6638100. PMID 30011125.
- Pandey, Sheo Shankar; Patnana, Pradeep Kumar; Padhi, Yasobanta; Chatterjee, Subhadeep (2018). "Low-iron conditions induces the hypersensitive reaction and pathogenicity hrp genes expression in Xanthomonas and is involved in modulation of hypersensitive response and virulence". Environmental Microbiology Reports. 10 (5): 522–531. Bibcode:2018EnvMR..10..522P. doi:10.1111/1758-2229.12650. ISSN 1758-2229. PMID 29687657. S2CID 25434358.
- Pandey, Sheo; Singh, Prashantee; Samal, Biswajit; Verma, Raj; Chatterjee, Subhadeep (2017). "Xanthoferrin Siderophore Estimation from the Cell-free Culture Supernatants of Different Xanthomonas Strains by HPLC". Bio-Protocol. 7 (14) e2410. doi:10.21769/bioprotoc.2410. ISSN 2331-8325. PMC 8413567. PMID 34541140.
- Pandey, Sheo Shankar; Patnana, Pradeep Kumar; Rai, Rikky; Chatterjee, Subhadeep (2017). "Xanthoferrin, the α-hydroxycarboxylate-type siderophore of Xanthomonas campestris pv. campestris, is required for optimum virulence and growth inside cabbage". Molecular Plant Pathology. 18 (7): 949–962. Bibcode:2017MolPP..18..949P. doi:10.1111/mpp.12451. ISSN 1364-3703. PMC 6638303. PMID 27348422.
- Chatterjee, Subhadeep; Pradhan, Binod Bihari; Kondreddy, Anil; Nizampatnam, Narasimha Rao; Kakkar, Akanksha (1 November 2015). "Xanthomonas campestris cell–cell signalling molecule DSF (diffusible signal factor) elicits innate immunity in plants and is suppressed by the exopolysaccharide xanthan". Journal of Experimental Botany. 66 (21): 6697–6714. doi:10.1093/jxb/erv377. ISSN 0022-0957. PMC 4623683. PMID 26248667.

== See also ==
- Xanthomonas
- Siderophore
- Xanthoferrin
