= N6-hydroxylysine O-acetyltransferase =

Identifiers
- EC no.: 2.3.1.102
- CAS no.: 101077-53-6

Databases
- IntEnz: IntEnz view
- BRENDA: BRENDA entry
- ExPASy: NiceZyme view
- KEGG: KEGG entry
- MetaCyc: metabolic pathway
- PRIAM: profile
- PDB structures: RCSB PDB PDBe PDBsum
- Gene Ontology: AmiGO / QuickGO
Search
- PMC: articles
- PubMed: articles
- NCBI: proteins

N6-hydroxylysine O-acetyltransferase (EC 2.3.1.102) is an enzyme that catalyzes the chemical reaction

N(6)-hydroxy-L-lysine
+
acetyl-CoA
N(6)-acetyl-N(6)-hydroxy-L-lysine
+ coenzyme A

The two substrates of this enzyme characterised from Escherichia coli are N(6)-hydroxy-L-lysine and acetyl-CoA. Its products are N(6)-acetyl-N(6)-hydroxy-L-lysine and coenzyme A.

Aerobactin

This enzyme belongs to the family of transferases, specifically those acyltransferases transferring groups other than aminoacyl groups. The systematic name of this enzyme class is acetyl-CoA:N6-hydroxy-L-lysine 6-acetyltransferase. Other names in common use include N6-hydroxylysine:acetyl CoA N6-transacetylase, N6-hydroxylysine acetylase, and acetyl-CoA:6-N-hydroxy-L-lysine 6-acetyltransferase. It participates in lysine degradation and the biosynthesis of the siderophore, aerobactin.
