= Mugineic acid =

Identifiers
CAS Number	69199-37-7
3D model (JSmol)	Interactive image
ChEBI	CHEBI:25426
ChemSpider	9242305
KEGG	C15500
PubChem CID	11067153
UNII	KR256JY76I
CompTox Dashboard (EPA)	DTXSID90988904
- InChI: InChI=1S/C12H20N2O8/c15-7(11(19)20)1-3-13-9(12(21)22)8(16)5-14-4-2-6(14)10(17)18/h6-9,13,15-16H,1-5H2,(H,17,18)(H,19,20)(H,21,22)/t6-,7-,8-,9-/m0/s1 Key: GJRGEVKCJPPZIT-JBDRJPRFSA-N
- SMILES: C1CN([C@@H]1C(=O)O)C[C@@H]([C@@H](C(=O)O)NCC[C@@H](C(=O)O)O)O

Properties
Chemical formula	C_{12}H_{20}N_{2}O_{8}
Molar mass	320.298 g·mol^{−1}
Appearance	white solid
- Except where otherwise noted, data are given for materials in their standard state (at 25 °C [77 °F], 100 kPa). Infobox references

Mugineic acid is the organic compound consisting of a azetidine group and three carboxylates. A colorless solid, it is a siderophore. More specifically, it is a phytosiderophore, i.e. a plant-produced siderophore. It functions as an iron accumulating agent for barley and other plants. Related phytosiderophores include nicotianamine and avenic acid.

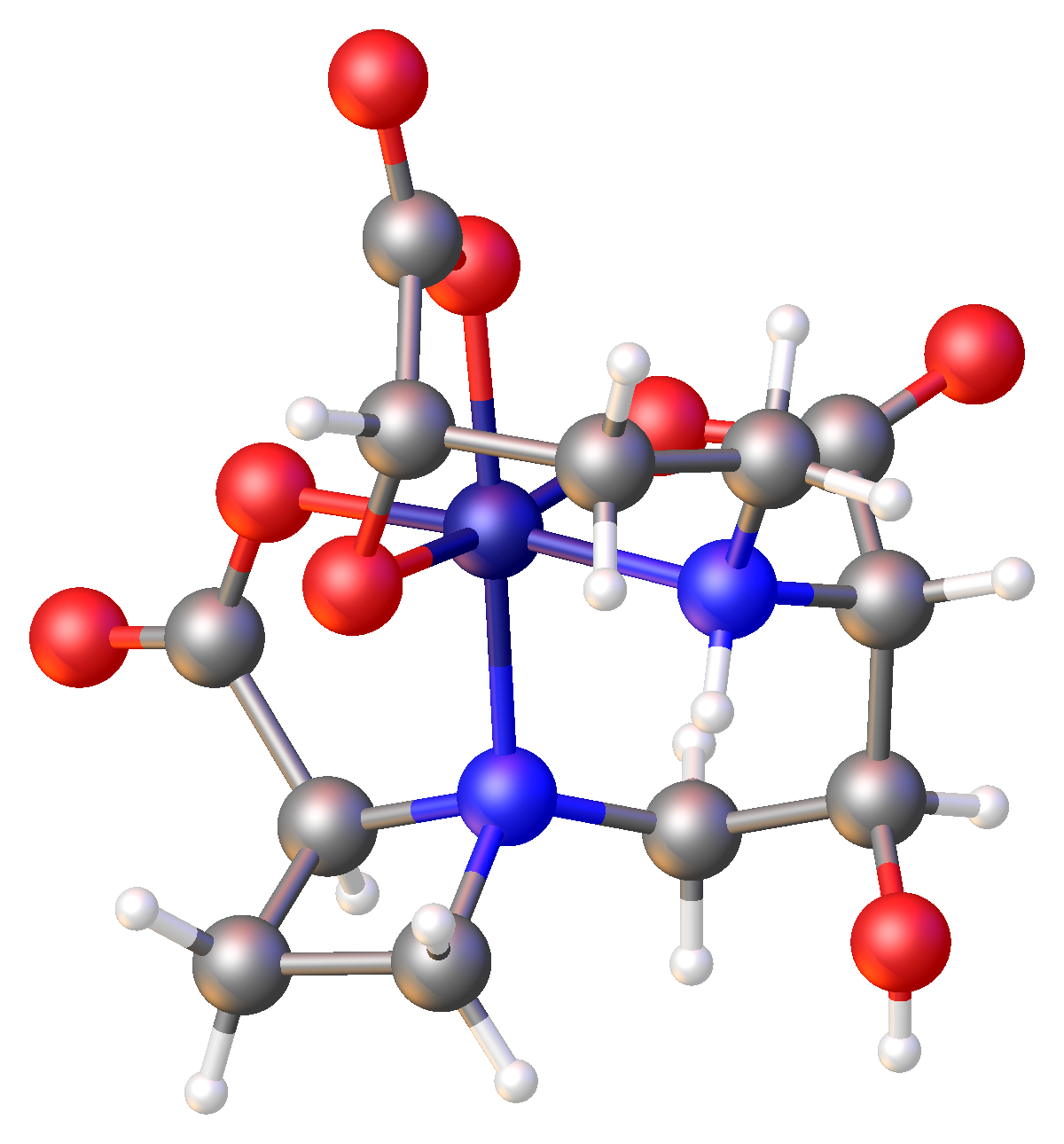
Structure of Co(III) complex of tetra-deprotonated mugineic acid (as sodium salt, not shown).

It is biosynthesized from S-methylmethionine. The compound binds metal ions as a hexadentate ligand.

== Biosynthesis ==
Mugineic acid is a derivative of the nicotianamine, a metal-chelating molecule ubiquitous in higher plants that is produced from three molecules of S-adenosyl methionine by the enzyme nicotianamine synthase.

The immediate precursor is 2'-deoxymugineic acid which is produced from nicotianamine by two reactions, catalysed by nicotianamine aminotransferase and 3''-deamino-3''-oxonicotianamine reductase.

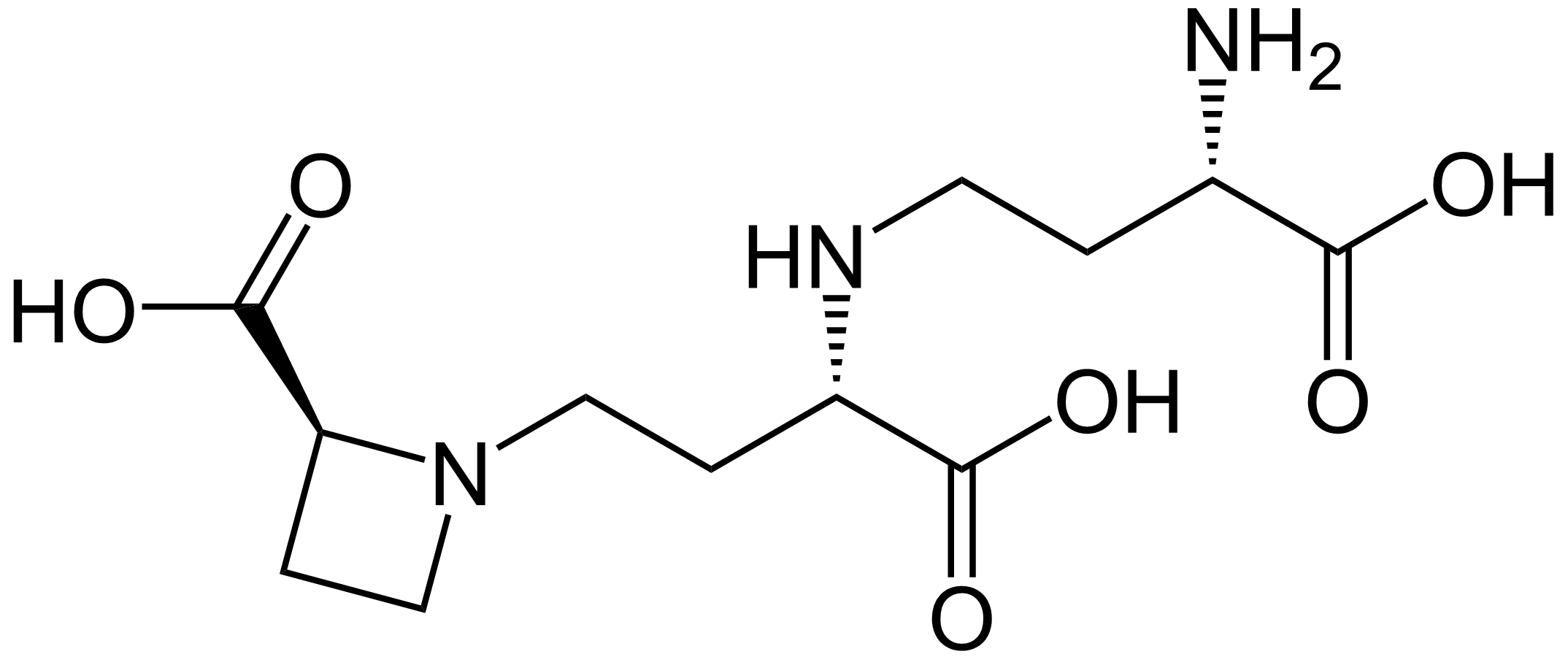
nicotianamine
Two enzymes
2'-deoxymugineic acid

This is followed by insertion of another hydroxyl group, catalysed by the alpha-ketoglutarate-dependent hydroxylase, 2'-deoxymugineic-acid 2'-dioxygenase:

2'-deoxymugineic acid
2'-dioxygenase
[O]
mugineic acid

Mugineic acid is also used as a precursor for the synthesis of other phytosiderophores which play a key role in iron uptake from the soil in graminaceous plants.
