= IUCC =

IUCC may refer to:

- Aerobactin synthase, an enzyme
- Israel Inter-University Computation Center
- Information Unit for Climate Change, a former unit of the United Nations Environment Programme
