= FepA =

Protein

Many bacteria secrete small iron-binding molecules called siderophores, which bind strongly to ferric ions. FepA is an integral bacterial outer membrane porin protein that belongs to outer membrane receptor family and provides the active transport of iron bound by the siderophore enterobactin from the extracellular space, into the periplasm of Gram-negative bacteria. FepA has also been shown to transport vitamin B12, and colicins B and D as well. This protein belongs to family of ligand-gated protein channels.

Because no energy is directly available to the outer membrane, the energy to drive the transport of ferric-enterobactin by FepA originates from the proton motive force (electrochemical gradient) generated by the inner membrane complex TonB–ExbB–ExbD. This force is relayed physically to FepA through direct interaction between FepA and TonB.

== Structure ==
The ferric ion pictured is bound by 3 catechol groups, as happens with the molecule enterobactin

Using X-ray crystallography the structure of FepA was found to be a 724-residue 22-stranded β-barrel. The extracellular side of the barrel contains loops that act as high-affinity and high-specificity ligand-binding sites for ferric-enterobactin. The N-terminus forms a smaller plug domain inside the hydrophilic barrel, effectively closing the pore. Studies of FhuA, a similar TonB-dependent outer membrane transporter, show that the interaction of the N-terminus domain to the inner walls of the pore is strengthened by nine salt-bridges and over 60 hydrogen bonds. The N-terminus also has two extracellular loops in the pore, which are thought to aid in the signal transduction between ligand-binding and TonB-mediated transport, though the precise mechanism is not clear. Residues 12 to 18 of the N-terminus domain of FepA comprise a region called the TonB box, which includes at least a proline and glycine residue.

Enterobactin is a cyclic tri-ester of 2,3-dihydroxybenzoylserine with a molecular mass of 719 Da. It binds ferric ions using six oxygens from three catechol groups, giving an overall charge of −3. Like the binding catechol, enterobactin is thought to also have a three-fold symmetry dissecting the metal center.

== Function ==
Iron is not usually readily available in the environment this group of bacteria find themselves in. However iron is essential in sustaining life due to its role in co-enzymes of respiration and DNA synthesis, so bacteria must adapt to have a mechanism for intake of iron. Because Fe^{3+} has a very low solubility, most of the Fe^{3+} ions in the bacteria’s surrounding environment (e.g. soil) exist as iron oxides or hydroxides, and so the number of free Fe^{3+} is low. Therefore, microbes have evolved to secret siderophores, Fe^{3+}-binding peptides, into the surroundings and then actively transport the Fe^{3+}-complex back into the cell by active transport. This can also be seen with pathogenic bacteria inside its host, where iron is bound tightly by haemoglobin, transferrin, lactoferrin and ferritin, and thus low in concentration (10^{−24} mol L^{−1}). Here it secretes siderophores which has a higher affinity (with a formation constant, or ([ML])/([M][L]), of 10^{49})to Fe^{3+} than the host's iron-binding proteins, and so will remove iron and then transported inside the cell. Bacillus anthracis, a Gram-positive bacteria that causes anthrax, secretes two siderophores: bacillibactin and petrobactin. Escherichia coli secretes many iron-siderophore transports, but produce only one siderophore—enterobactin. The ferric enterobactin receptor FepA recognises the catecholate part of ferric enterobactin (FeEnt), and transports it across the outer membrane from the extracellular space into the periplasm. The binding is thought to be in two phases, a fast step which recognises FeEnt, and a slower step which may be the first step in translocation—preparing the complex for translocation. Both steps occur independently of the TonB–ExbB–ExbD complex and the proton motive force it provides. In the periplasm, FeEnt is bound by FepB and passed to the integral inner membrane proteins FepG and FepD through active transport, with the energy provided by ATP hydrolysis catalysed by cytoplasmic FepC. In the cytoplasm, the Fes enterobactin esterase hydrolyses and this cleaves enterobactin, releasing Fe^{3+} which will subsequently be reduced by the same protein, Fes, to Fe^{2+}.

== Possible Mechanisms ==
When enterobactin binds ferric iron, this both alters the 3-dimensional conformation of the molecule and changes the charge from neutral to negative 3. The FepA binding site, formed by the extracellular loops, is composed of positively charged amino acids. The combination of charge-specificity and size restriction of the barrel makes FepA import highly specific for ferric-enterobactin.

The mechanism of transport has been described as similar to an air lock. When the ligand is bound, it is hypothesized to close the pore at the extracellular side, thus preventing anything from exiting through the pore. FepA then interacts with TonB through a 5 amino acid consensus sequence, which induces a change to the N-terminal opening a channel to the periplasmic side. This would allow FepA to transport ferric-enterobactin without allowing ions and small molecules from passing in either direction.

When the ligand is bound by FepA, the conformation of the N-terminal domain is changed so as to open the pore. There is controversy regarding how space is opened within the barrel to allow the ligand to pass through. Either the N-terminal plug domain remains within the barrel and undergoes conformational changes to create a pore or it temporarily drops out of the barrel. It has been hypothesized that it is energetically nonsensical to remove the whole of the N-terminal domain for translocation, because this requires the breakage of the salt bridges and numerous hydrogen bonds, however, since the barrel is water-filled, the energy required would be much less than previously thought.

The role of the N-terminus is revealed by using a deletion mutation of the N-terminal plug; the protein was still able to be inserted into the membrane, but acts as a non-selective pore for larger molecules, exhibited by increased permeability of the cell to maltotetraose, maltopentaose, ferrichrome, as well as several antibiotics including albomycin, vancomycin and bacitracin. However, this has to be treated with caution, as the conformation of the barrel may change in the absence of the N-terminal plug.
