= FEPA =

FEPA may refer to:

- Family Entertainment Protection Act
- Foreign Extortion Prevention Act
- FepA, a protein
