= Outer membrane receptor =

TonB dependent receptor
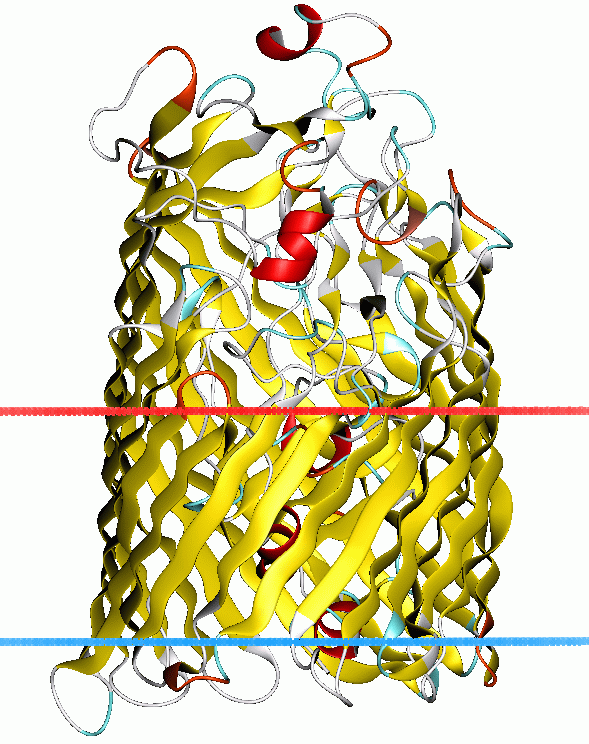
- Structure of ferric hydroxamate uptake receptor

Identifiers
- Symbol: TonB_dep_Rec
- Pfam: PF00593
- Pfam clan: CL0193
- InterPro: IPR000531
- PROSITE: PDOC00354
- SCOP2: 2fcp / SCOPe / SUPFAM
- TCDB: 1.B.14
- OPM superfamily: 33
- OPM protein: 1qfg
- CDD: cd01347
Available protein structures:
- PDB: IPR000531 PF00593 (ECOD; PDBsum)
- AlphaFold: IPR000531; PF00593

Outer membrane receptors, also known as TonB-dependent receptors, are a family of beta barrel proteins named for their localization in the outer membrane of gram-negative bacteria. TonB complexes sense signals from the outside of bacterial cells and transmit them into the cytoplasm, leading to transcriptional activation of target genes. TonB-dependent receptors in gram-negative bacteria are associated with the uptake and transport of large substrates such as iron siderophore complexes and vitamin B_{12}.

== TonB interactions with other proteins ==
In Escherichia coli, the TonB protein interacts with outer membrane receptor proteins that carry out high-affinity binding and energy-dependent uptake of specific substrates into the periplasmic space. These substrates are either poorly transported through non-specific porin channels or are encountered at very low concentrations. In the absence of TonB, these receptors bind their substrates but do not carry out active transport. TonB-dependent regulatory systems consist of six protein protein components.

The proteins that are currently known or presumed to interact with TonB include BtuB, CirA, FatA, FcuT, FecA, FhuA, FhuE, FepA, FptA, HemR, IrgA, IutA, PfeA, PupA, LbpA and TbpA. The TonB protein also interacts with some colicins. Most of these proteins contain a short conserved region at their N-terminus.

== TonB-dependent receptor plug domain ==
TonB-dependent Receptor Plug Domain

Identifiers
- Symbol: Plug
- Pfam: PF07715
- InterPro: IPR012910
- SCOP2: 1fi1 / SCOPe / SUPFAM
Available protein structures:
- PDB: IPR012910 PF07715 (ECOD; PDBsum)
- AlphaFold: IPR012910; PF07715

TonB-dependent receptors include a plug domain, an independently folding subunit that acts as the channel gate, blocking the pore until the channel is bound by ligand. At this point it undergoes conformational changes, opening the channel.

== TonB as phage receptor ==
TonB also acts as a receptor for Salmonella bacteriophage H8. In fact, H8 infection is TonB dependent.
