= Nicotianamine aminotransferase =

Identifiers
- EC no.: 2.6.1.80

Databases
- IntEnz: IntEnz view
- BRENDA: BRENDA entry
- ExPASy: NiceZyme view
- KEGG: KEGG entry
- MetaCyc: metabolic pathway
- PRIAM: profile
- PDB structures: RCSB PDB PDBe PDBsum
Search
- PMC: articles
- PubMed: articles
- NCBI: proteins

Nicotianamine aminotransferase (EC 2.6.1.80) is an enzyme that catalyzes the chemical reaction

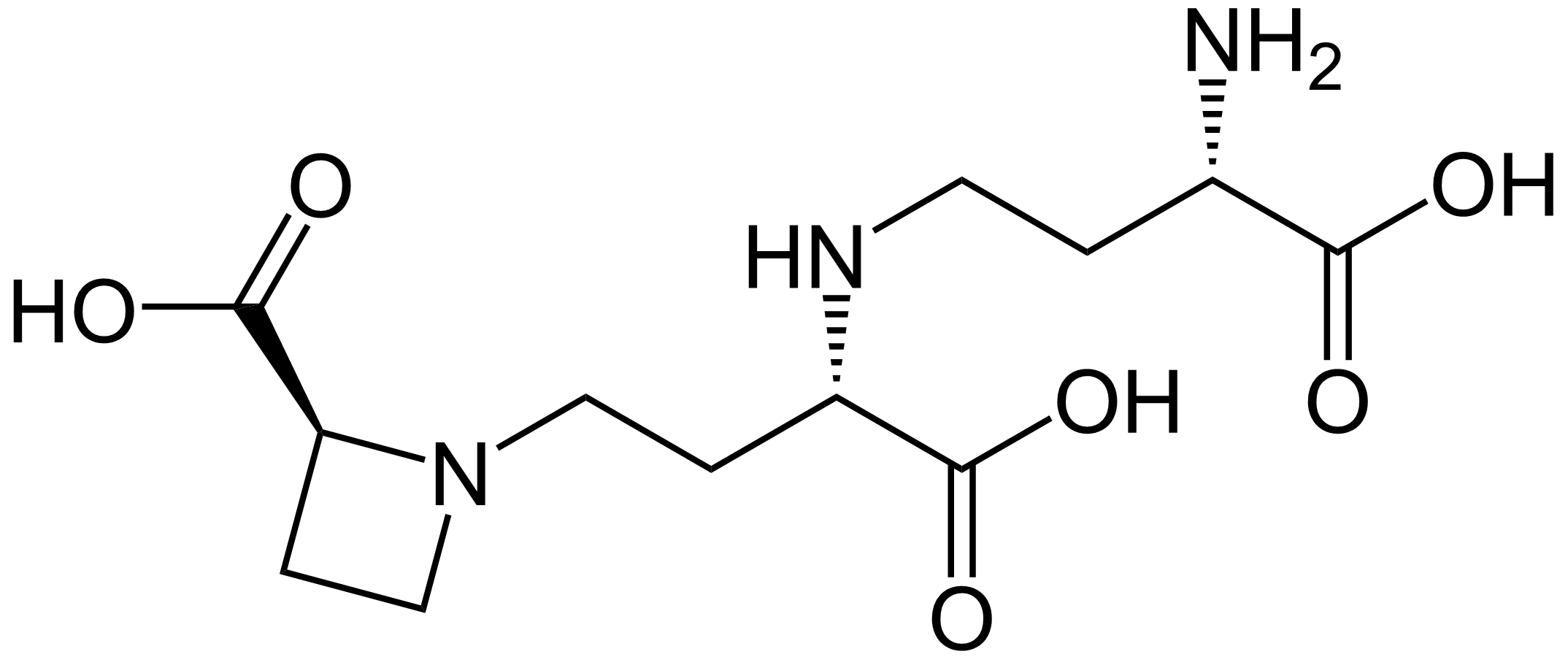
nicotianamine
+
2-oxoglutaric acid
O_{2}
CO_{2}
3"-deamino-3"-oxonicotianamine
+
succinic acid

The two substrates of this enzyme are nicotianamine and 2-oxoglutaric acid. Its products are 3"-deamino-3"-oxonicotianamine and glutamic acid.

This enzyme belongs to the family of transferases, specifically the transaminases, which transfer nitrogenous groups. The systematic name of this enzyme class is nicotianamine:2-oxoglutarate aminotransferase; nicotianamine transaminase. Other names in common use include NAAT, NAAT-I, NAAT-II, and NAAT-III.

Both the starting material and product of this enzyme are phytosiderophores that help higher plants absorb metal ions from soil.
