= Tequintavirus =

Virus classification
- (unranked): Virus
- Realm: Duplodnaviria
- Kingdom: Heunggongvirae
- Phylum: Uroviricota
- Class: Caudoviricetes
- Order: Caudovirales (abolished 2021)
- Family: Demerecviridae
- Subfamily: Markadamsvirinae
- Genus: Tequintavirus

Genus of viruses

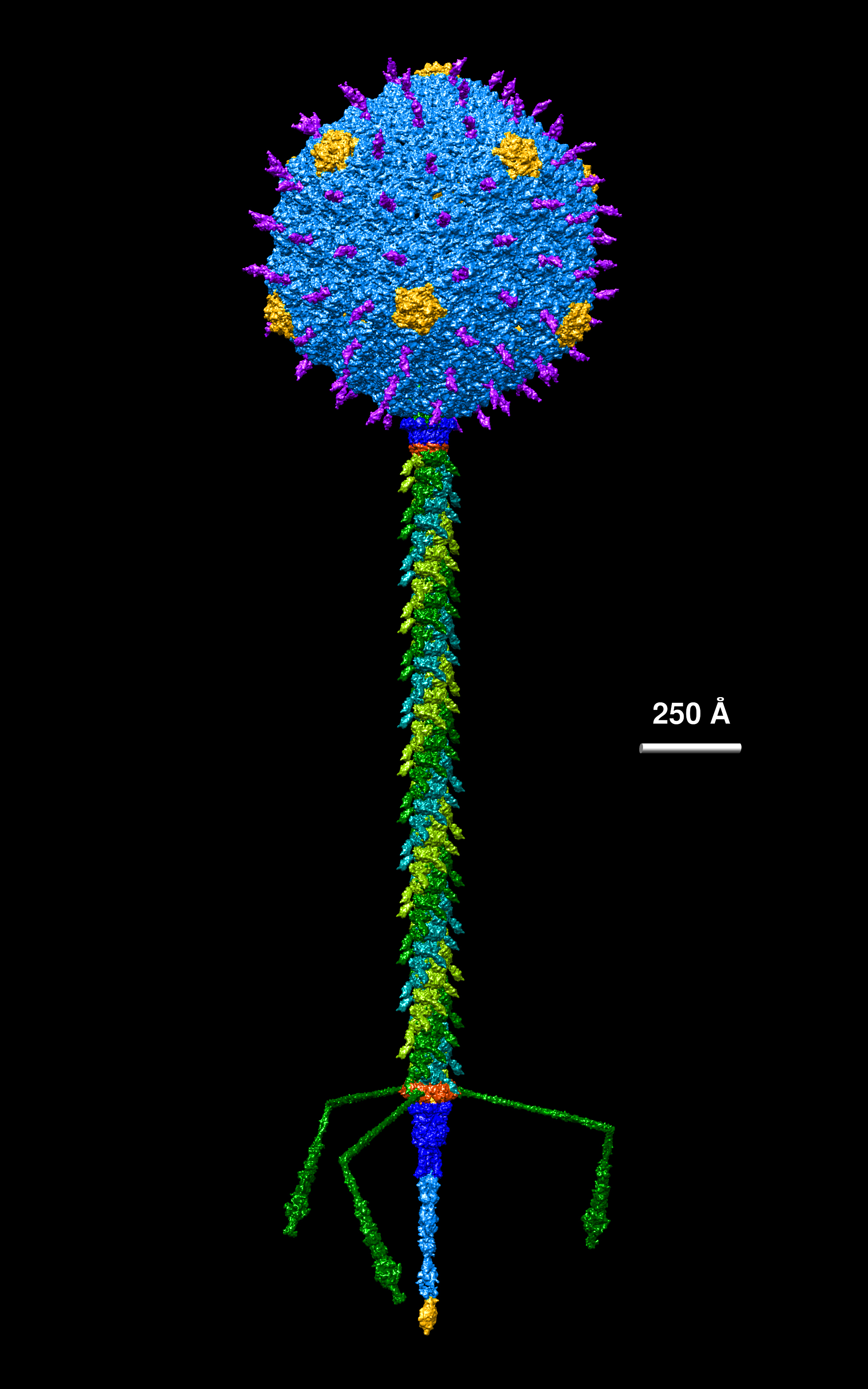
Bacteriophage phB7 built from individual pdbs and cryoEMs with UCSF Chimera software.

Tequintavirus (synonyms T5-like phages, T5-like viruses, T5likevirus) is a genus of viruses in the family Demerecviridae. Bacteria serve as the natural host, with transmission achieved through passive diffusion. The genus contains 70 species.

== Structure ==
Tequintaviruses are nonenveloped, with a head and tail. The head is icosahedral (T=13) and is about 90 nm in diameter. The tail is about 180 nm long, 9 nm wide. It has three long, kinked terminal fibers around 120 nm in length, and a single straight central fiber attached to a conical tip.

Genus	Structure	Symmetry	Capsid	Genomic arrangement	Genomic segmentation
Tequintavirus	Head-Tail	T=13	Non-enveloped	Linear	Monopartite

== Genome ==
Genomes are linear, around 121kb in length. Bacteriophage T5 and several other species have been fully sequenced. The genomes range between roughly 108-121 thousand nucleotides, with about 140 to 170 predicted open reading frames. The complete genomes, as well as two other similar, unclassified genomes are available here.

== Life cycle ==
The virus attaches to the host cell's adhesion receptors using its terminal fibers, and degrades the cell wall using viral exolysin sufficiently eject the viral DNA into the host cytoplasm via long flexible tail ejection system. Replication follows the DNA strand displacement, via replicative transposition model. DNA-templated transcription is the method of transcription. Once the viral genes have been replicated, the procapsid is assembled and packed. The tail is then assembled and the mature virions are released via lysis. Bacteria serve as the natural host. Transmission routes are passive diffusion.

Genus	Host details	Tissue tropism	Entry details	Release details	Replication site	Assembly site	Transmission
Tequintavirus	Bacteria	None	Injection	Lysis	Cytoplasm	Cytoplasm	Passive diffusion

== Taxonomy ==
The genus contains the following species:

- Tequintavirus ABTNLsp4
- Tequintavirus ABTNLsp9
- Tequintavirus AKFV33
- Tequintavirus APCEc03
- Tequintavirus BB1
- Tequintavirus BF23
- Tequintavirus chee24
- Tequintavirus DaisyDussoix
- Tequintavirus DT5712
- Tequintavirus DT57C
- Tequintavirus E22
- Tequintavirus EC100
- Tequintavirus EC148
- Tequintavirus ECOP18
- Tequintavirus ESCO30
- Tequintavirus ESCO40
- Tequintavirus ev219
- Tequintavirus FFH1
- Tequintavirus fp01
- Tequintavirus gostya9
- Tequintavirus GSP044
- Tequintavirus H8
- Tequintavirus HASG4
- Tequintavirus HdH2
- Tequintavirus hildybeyeler
- Tequintavirus IME178
- Tequintavirus irisvonroten
- Tequintavirus JLBYU40
- Tequintavirus JLBYU43
- Tequintavirus KPP2018
- Tequintavirus L6jm
- Tequintavirus lindwurm
- Tequintavirus LLS
- Tequintavirus LmqsSP1
- Tequintavirus mar004NP2
- Tequintavirus N5
- Tequintavirus NBEco001
- Tequintavirus NBEco002
- Tequintavirus NBSal003
- Tequintavirus NBSal005
- Tequintavirus NR01
- Tequintavirus oldekolle
- Tequintavirus OSYSP
- Tequintavirus P1100107
- Tequintavirus phA11
- Tequintavirus phB7
- Tequintavirus phC17
- Tequintavirus PNJ1902
- Tequintavirus S124
- Tequintavirus S131
- Tequintavirus SA001
- Tequintavirus SE11
- Tequintavirus selmaratti
- Tequintavirus shivani
- Tequintavirus SHSML45
- Tequintavirus slur09
- Tequintavirus SP01
- Tequintavirus SP3
- Tequintavirus SP15
- Tequintavirus SPC35
- Tequintavirus SSP1
- Tequintavirus T5
- Tequintavirus Th1
- Tequintavirus tv179112
- Tequintavirus tv3sent1
- Tequintavirus tv8sent1748
- Tequintavirus tvI1
- Tequintavirus VEc33
- Tequintavirus VSe12
- Tequintavirus vVAH1

== History ==
According to ICTV's 1996 report, the genus T5likevirus was first accepted under the name T5-like phages, assigned only to family Siphoviridae. The whole family was moved to order Caudovirales in 1998, and the genus was renamed to T5-like viruses in ICTV's 7th Report in 1999. In 2013, it was renamed to T5likevirus, and in 2016 it was renamed again to T5virus. In 2020, The genus was renamed to Tequintavirus and placed in the newly established family Demerecviridae and subfamily Markadamsvirinae.
