= Vibriobactin =

Names
- Systematic IUPAC name (4S,5R)-N-[3-(2,3-Dihydroxybenzamido)propyl]-2-(2,3-dihydroxyphenyl)-5-methyl-N-{3-[(4R,5S)-5-methyl-2-(2,3-dihydroxyphenyl)-4,5-dihydro-1,3-oxazole-4-carboxamido]propyl}-4,5-dihydro-1,3-oxazole-4-carboxamide

Identifiers
CAS Number	88217-23-6
3D model (JSmol)	Interactive image; Ferric:: Interactive image
ChEBI	CHEBI:9973; Ferric:: CHEBI:61375
ChemSpider	26333225
KEGG	C06769
PubChem CID	441167; Ferric:: 50909840
- InChI: InChI=1S/C35H39N5O11/c1-18-26(38-33(50-18)21-9-4-12-24(42)29(21)45)32(48)37-15-7-17-40(16-6-14-36-31(47)20-8-3-11-23(41)28(20)44)35(49)27-19(2)51-34(39-27)22-10-5-13-25(43)30(22)46/h3-5,8-13,18-19,26-27,41-46H,6-7,14-17H2,1-2H3,(H,36,47)(H,37,48)/t18-,19+,26+,27-/m0/s1 Key: LLMKLMMXMOTPRU-YOAXHERRSA-N; Ferric:: InChI=1S/C35H39N5O11.Fe/c1-18-26(38-33(50-18)21-9-4-12-24(42)29(21)45)32(48)37-15-7-17-40(16-6-14-36-31(47)20-8-3-11-23(41)28(20)44)35(49)27-19(2)51-34(39-27)22-10-5-13-25(43)30(22)46;/h3-5,8-13,18-19,26-27,41-46H,6-7,14-17H2,1-2H3,(H,36,47)(H,37,48);/q;+3/p-6/t18-,19+,26+,27-;/m0./s1 Key: XCZXQZJLNMPXIV-VBIAIPROSA-H
- SMILES: C[C@H]1[C@@H](N=C(O1)C2=C(C(=CC=C2)O)O)C(=O)NCCCN(CCCNC(=O)C3=C(C(=CC=C3)O)O)C(=O)[C@@H]4[C@H](OC(=N4)C5=C(C(=CC=C5)O)O)C; Ferric:: [H][C@@]12N=C(O[C@H]1C)c1cccc3[O-][Fe+3]456([O-]c7cccc(C(=O)NCCCN(CCCNC2=O)C(=O)[C@@]2([H])N=C(O[C@@H]2C)c2cccc([O-]4)c2[O-]5)c7[O-]6)[O-]c13

Properties
Chemical formula	C_{35}H_{39}N_{5}O_{11}
Molar mass	705.721 g·mol^{−1}
- Except where otherwise noted, data are given for materials in their standard state (at 25 °C [77 °F], 100 kPa). Infobox references

Vibriobactin is a catechol siderophore that helps the microbial system to acquire iron. It was first isolated from Vibrio cholerae.

== Structure and biosynthesis ==
The components of vibriobactin are three 2,3-dihydroxybenzoic acid (DHB), two threonine (Thr), and one norspermidine (NSPD). DHB is synthesized from chorismic acid by a series of enzymes: VibA, VibB, and VibC. DHB is linked to NSPD by VibE, VibB and VibH in order and forms DHB-NSPD. On the other hand, DHB performs condensation and cyclization with Thr by VibE, VibB, and VibF to form the heterocyclic molecule linked on VibF: DHB-Thr-VibF. DHB-NSPD and DHB-Thr-VibF are then put together by VibF to form vibriobactin.

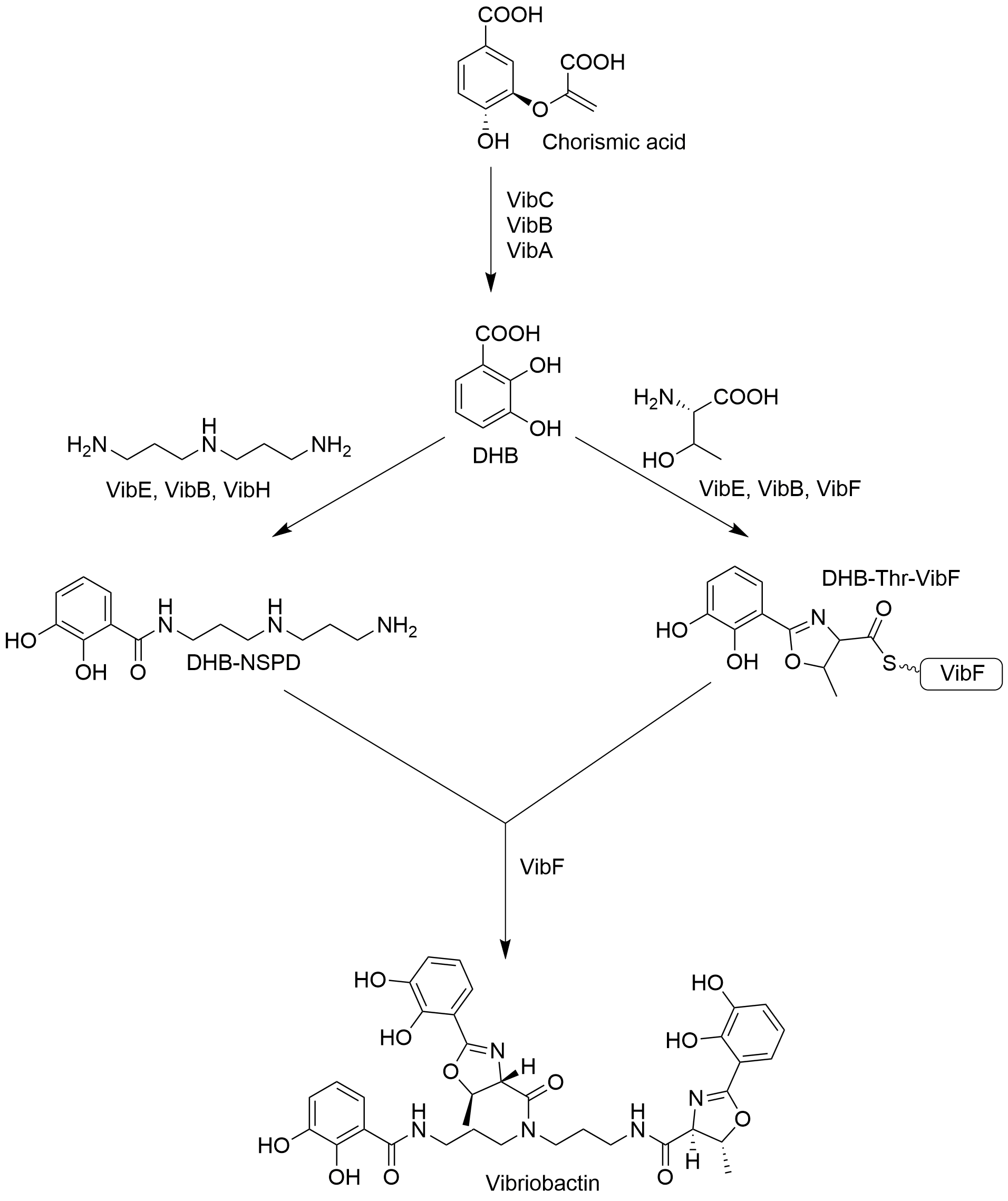
