= Escherichia virus H8 =

Bacteriophage H8

Virus classification
- (unranked): Virus
- Realm: Duplodnaviria
- Kingdom: Heunggongvirae
- Phylum: Uroviricota
- Class: Caudoviricetes
- Order: Caudovirales
- Family: Demerecviridae
- Genus: Tequintavirus
- Species: Tequintavirus H8

Synonyms
- Escherichia virus H8

Species of virus

Bacteriophage H8 is a bacteriophage known to infect bacterial species of the genus Escherichia and the related genus Salmonella. Its shape and genome are similar to that of Bacteriophage T5.

== Genome ==
The phage H8 genome is 104.4 kilobases long and contains 143 predicted open reading frames.
