= Aerobactin synthase =

Class of enzymes

Identifiers
- EC no.: 6.3.2.39
- CAS no.: 94047-30-0

Databases
- IntEnz: IntEnz view
- BRENDA: BRENDA entry
- ExPASy: NiceZyme view
- KEGG: KEGG entry
- MetaCyc: metabolic pathway
- PRIAM: profile
- PDB structures: RCSB PDB PDBe PDBsum
- Gene Ontology: AmiGO / QuickGO
Search
- PMC: articles
- PubMed: articles
- NCBI: proteins

Aerobactin synthase (EC 6.3.2.39) is an enzyme that catalyzes the chemical reaction

4 ATP + citrate + 2 N^{6}-acetyl-N^{6}-hydroxy-L-lysine + 2 H_{2}O $\rightleftharpoons$ 4 ADP + 4 phosphate + aerobactin

The enzyme from Aerobacter aerogenes combines two units of a lysine-derived compound with citric acid, driven by the energy produced by the hydrolysis of adenosine triphosphate (ATP) to adenosine diphosphate (ADP):

2
N(6)-acetyl-N(6)-hydroxy-L-lysine
+
citric acid
aerobactin

The product, aerobactin, is a siderophore that chelates iron, allowing uptake of that element into bacteria.

The enzyme has also been characterised from Escherichia coli and belongs to the family of ligases, specifically those forming carbon-nitrogen bonds as acid-D-amino-acid ligases (peptide synthases). The systematic name of this enzyme class is citrate:N^{6}-acetyl-N^{6}-hydroxy-L-lysine ligase (ADP-forming). It is also called citrate:6-N-acetyl-6-N-hydroxy-L-lysine ligase (ADP-forming).
