= Yersiniabactin =

Identifiers
3D model (JSmol)	Interactive image
ChEBI	CHEBI:29707
ChEMBL	ChEMBL1221692
ChemSpider	34947481
KEGG	C12038
PubChem CID	443589
- InChI: InChI=1S/C21H27N3O4S3/c1-20(2,18-24-21(3,10-31-18)19(27)28)15(26)12-8-30-17(22-12)13-9-29-16(23-13)11-6-4-5-7-14(11)25/h4-7,12-13,15,17,22,25-26H,8-10H2,1-3H3,(H,27,28)/t12-,13-,15-,17+,21-/m1/s1 Key: JHYVWAMMAMCUIR-BKEHUNJYSA-N; InChI=1/C21H27N3O4S3/c1-20(2,18-24-21(3,10-31-18)19(27)28)15(26)12-8-30-17(22-12)13-9-29-16(23-13)11-6-4-5-7-14(11)25/h4-7,12-13,15,17,22,25-26H,8-10H2,1-3H3,(H,27,28)/t12-,13-,15-,17+,21-/m1/s1 Key: JHYVWAMMAMCUIR-BKEHUNJYBK
- SMILES: CC(C)([C@H](O)[C@@H]1CSC(N1)[C@H]2CSC(=N2)c3ccccc3O)C4=N[C@](C)(CS4)C(=O)O

Properties
Chemical formula	C_{21}H_{27}N_{3}O_{4}S_{3}
Molar mass	481.64 g·mol^{−1}
- Except where otherwise noted, data are given for materials in their standard state (at 25 °C [77 °F], 100 kPa). Infobox references

Yersiniabactin (Ybt) is a siderophore found in the pathogenic bacteria Yersinia pestis, Yersinia pseudotuberculosis, and Yersinia enterocolitica, as well as several strains of enterobacteria including enteropathogenic Escherichia coli and Salmonella enterica. Siderophores, compounds of low molecular mass with high affinities for ferric iron, are important virulence factors in pathogenic bacteria. Iron—an essential element for life used for such cellular processes as respiration and DNA replication—is extensively chelated by host proteins like lactoferrin and ferritin; thus, the pathogen produces molecules with an even higher affinity for Fe^{3+} than these proteins in order to acquire sufficient iron for growth. As a part of such an iron-uptake system, yersiniabactin plays an important role in pathogenicity of Y. pestis, Y. pseudotuberculosis, and Y. entercolitica.

== Structure and coordination properties ==
Yersiniabactin is a four ring structure composed of carbon, hydrogen, nitrogen, oxygen, and sulfur. According to X-ray crystallography, it binds Fe^{3+}as a 1:1 complex by three nitrogen electron pairs and three negatively charged oxygen atoms (each set in meridional positions) with a distorted octahedral structure. The Ybt-Fe^{3+} complex has a proton-independent formation constant of 4 x 10^{36}.

== Biosynthesis ==
Ybt synthesis occurs by a mixed nonribosomal peptide synthetase (NRPS)/polyketide synthase (PKS) mechanism. Several enzymes, most notably the HMWP2-HMWP1complex, assemble salicylate, three cysteines, a malonyl linker group and three methyl groups into a four-ring structure made of salicylate, one thiazolidine, and two thiazoline rings with a malonyl linker between the thiazoline and the thiazolidine. YbtD, a phosphopantetheinyl transferase, adds phosphopantetheine tethers to the cysteine, salicylate and malonyl groups to HMWP1 and HMWP2. YbtS synthesizes salicylate from chorismate, which is then adenylated by YbtE and transferred to the HMWP2–HMWP1 assembly complex. HMWP2, which consists of two multidomain NRPS modules, accepts the activated salicylate unit through a carrier protein, then cyclizes and condenses two cysteines to form two thiazoline rings. A malonyl linker is added by the PKS portion of HMWP1, and YbtU reduces the second thiazoline ring to thiazolidine before cyclization and condensation of the final thiazoline ring on HMWP1's NRPs domain. YbtT thioesterase may serve some editing function to remove abnormal molecules from the enzyme complex, and a thioesterase domain of HMWP1 releases the completed siderophore from the enzyme complex.

== Regulation of expression ==
The HPI upon which the genes encoding the Ybt biosynthesis proteins are located is controlled by a series of molecular regulators. All four promoter regions of the yersiniabactin region (psn, irp2, ybtA and ybtP) possess a Fur-binding site and are negatively regulated by this repressor in the presence of iron. In the presence of Ybt, a member of the AraC family of transcriptional regulators, activates expression from the psn, irp2 and ybtP (transport and biosynthetic genes) promoters but represses expression of its own promoter. There is also evidence that yersiniabactin itself may upregulate its own expression and that of psn/fyuA and ybtPQXS at the transcription level.

== Role in Yersinia pathogenicity ==
As previously mentioned, siderophores serve the essential function of iron acquisition for pathogens in the low iron conditions of the host. Thus the successful establishment of disease depends on the ability of the invading organism to acquire iron. Because of its high affinity for iron, yersiniabactin can solubilize the metal bound to host binding proteins and transport it back to the bacteria. The complex yersiniabactin-Fe^{3+} recognizes the specific bacterial outer membrane TonB-dependent receptor, FyuA (Psn), and is translocated with the help of membrane-embedded proteins into the cytosol where the iron is discharged from yersiniabactin and used in various metabolic pathways. In the absence of a high-affinity iron-chelating compound, pathogenic Yersinia, responsible for such lethal disease as the bubonic plague, only causes local symptoms of moderate intensity. The availability of iron, through an intrinsic high-affinity iron-chelating system such as Ybt, provides the bacteria with the ability to multiply in the host and to cause systemic infections.
