= 3''-deamino-3''-oxonicotianamine reductase =

Class of enzymes

3″-deamino-3″-oxonicotianamine reductase

Identifiers
- EC no.: 1.1.1.285

Databases
- IntEnz: IntEnz view
- BRENDA: BRENDA entry
- ExPASy: NiceZyme view
- KEGG: KEGG entry
- MetaCyc: metabolic pathway
- PRIAM: profile
- PDB structures: RCSB PDB PDBe PDBsum
Search
- PMC: articles
- PubMed: articles
- NCBI: proteins

3''-deamino-3''-oxonicotianamine reductase (EC 1.1.1.285) is an enzyme that catalyzes the chemical reaction

3"-deamino-3"-oxonicotianamine
+ NADH
H^{+}
H^{+}
2'-deoxymugineic acid
+ NAD^{+}

The three substrates of this enzyme are 3''-deamino-3''-oxonicotianamine, reduced nicotinamide adenine dinucleotide (NADH), and a proton. Its products are 2'-deoxymugineic acid and oxidised (NAD^{+}). This enzyme can also use the alternative cofactor, nicotinamide adenine dinucleotide phosphate.

This enzyme belongs to the family of oxidoreductases, specifically those acting on the CH-OH group of donor with NAD^{+} or NADP^{+} as acceptor. The systematic name of this enzyme class is 2-deoxymugineic acid:NAD(P)^{+} 3-oxidoreductase. It is part of the pathway which converts the siderophore, nicotianamine, to other metal-chelating molecules in higher plants. These allow the plant to efficiently take up metals such as zinc and iron from the soil.
