= Rhodotorulic acid =

Names
- IUPAC name N-[3-[5-[3-[Acetyl(hydroxy)amino]propyl]-3,6-dioxopiperazin-2-yl]propyl]-N-hydroxyacetamide

Identifiers
CAS Number	18928-00-2
3D model (JSmol)	Interactive image
ChEBI	CHEBI:84731
ChEMBL	ChEMBL322490
ChemSpider	27282
ECHA InfoCard	100.038.786
EC Number	242-681-9
PubChem CID	29337
UNII	61F3VBQ4G5
CompTox Dashboard (EPA)	DTXSID20940439
- InChI: InChI=1S/C14H24N4O6/c1-9(19)17(23)7-3-5-11-13(21)16-12(14(22)15-11)6-4-8-18(24)10(2)20/h11-12,23-24H,3-8H2,1-2H3,(H,15,22)(H,16,21) Key: PUWVNTVQJFSBDH-UHFFFAOYSA-N
- SMILES: CC(=O)N(CCCC1C(=O)NC(C(=O)N1)CCCN(C(=O)C)O)O

Properties
Chemical formula	C_{14}H_{24}N_{4}O_{6}
Molar mass	344.368 g·mol^{−1}
Density	1.277 g/cm^{3}
Solubility in water	0.96 g/cm^{3} (25 °C) @ pH 7 (water)
- Except where otherwise noted, data are given for materials in their standard state (at 25 °C [77 °F], 100 kPa). verify (what is ?) Infobox references

Rhodotorulic acid is the smallest of the 2,5-diketopiperazine family of hydroxamate siderophores which are high-affinity chelating agents for ferric iron, produced by bacterial and fungal phytopathogens for scavenging iron from the environment. It is a tetradentate ligand, meaning it binds one iron atom in four locations (two hydroxamate and two lactam moieties), and forms Fe_{2}(siderophore)_{3} complexes to fulfill an octahedral coordination for iron.

Rhodotorulic acid occurs in basidiomycetous yeasts and was found to retard the spore germination of the fungus Botrytis cinerea. In combination with yeast Rhodotorula glutinis it was found to be effective in the biocontrol of iprodione-resistant B. cinerea of apple wounds caused by the disease.
