= 2'-deoxymugineic-acid 2'-dioxygenase =

Class of enzymes

Identifiers
- EC no.: 1.14.11.24

Databases
- IntEnz: IntEnz view
- BRENDA: BRENDA entry
- ExPASy: NiceZyme view
- KEGG: KEGG entry
- MetaCyc: metabolic pathway
- PRIAM: profile
- PDB structures: RCSB PDB PDBe PDBsum
Search
- PMC: articles
- PubMed: articles
- NCBI: proteins

2'-deoxymugineic-acid 2'-dioxygenase (EC 1.14.11.24) is an enzyme that catalyzes the chemical reaction

2'-deoxymugineic acid
Fe(IV)=O
Fe(II)
mugineic acid

The two substrates of this enzyme are 2'-deoxymugineic acid and oxygen. Its product is mugineic acid (a derivative of azetidine-2-carboxylic acid).

The enzyme is an alpha-ketoglutarate-dependent hydroxylase with systematic name 2'-deoxymugineic acid,2-oxoglutarate:oxygen oxidoreductase (2-hydroxylating). It is also called IDS3. The active site of this non-heme iron protein generates a ferryl intermediate where Fe(IV)=O is the species that transfers its oxygen to the substrate.

This mechanism requires 2-oxoglutaric acid to activate the iron oxygen complex, and this gives succinic acid and carbon dioxide when the second atom of the molecular oxygen is removed.

2-oxoglutaric acid
[O]
CO_{2}
succinic acid
