= Ramesh Venkata Sonti =

Indian Geneticist

- Born: 24 May 1960 (age 66); Andhra Pradesh, India
- Education: University of Hyderabad; University of Utah; Massachusetts Institute of Technology
- Known for: Improved Samba Mahsuri
- Scientific career
- Fields: Biology
- Workplaces: Centre for Cellular and Molecular Biology (CCMB) National Institute of Plant Genome Research (NIPGR) Indian Institute of Science Education and Research, Tirupati (IISER, Tirupati)

Ramesh Venkata Sonti is an Indian plant Geneticist. He did his MPhil in life sciences from University of Hyderabad. He holds Doctor of philosophy in bacterial genetics from the University of Utah, supplemented with Post Doctoral training in Plant genetics from the Massachusetts Institute of Technology. He was positioned as a Senior Scientist at the Centre for Cellular and Molecular Biology in Hyderabad, India. He was awarded in June 2004 the Shanti Swarup Bhatnagar Prize for Science and Technology, the highest science award in India, in the Biological sciences category.

== Prizes and honours ==
- National Bioscience Award for Career Development of the Department of Biotechnology, Government of India.
- Shanti Swarup Bhatnagar Prize for Science and Technology for 2004.

== Research highlights ==
- Virulence mechanisms of the important bacterial leaf blight pathogen of the rice plant.
- Introduction of bacterial leaf blight resistance characteristics into the background of commercially important but disease susceptible rice varieties.
