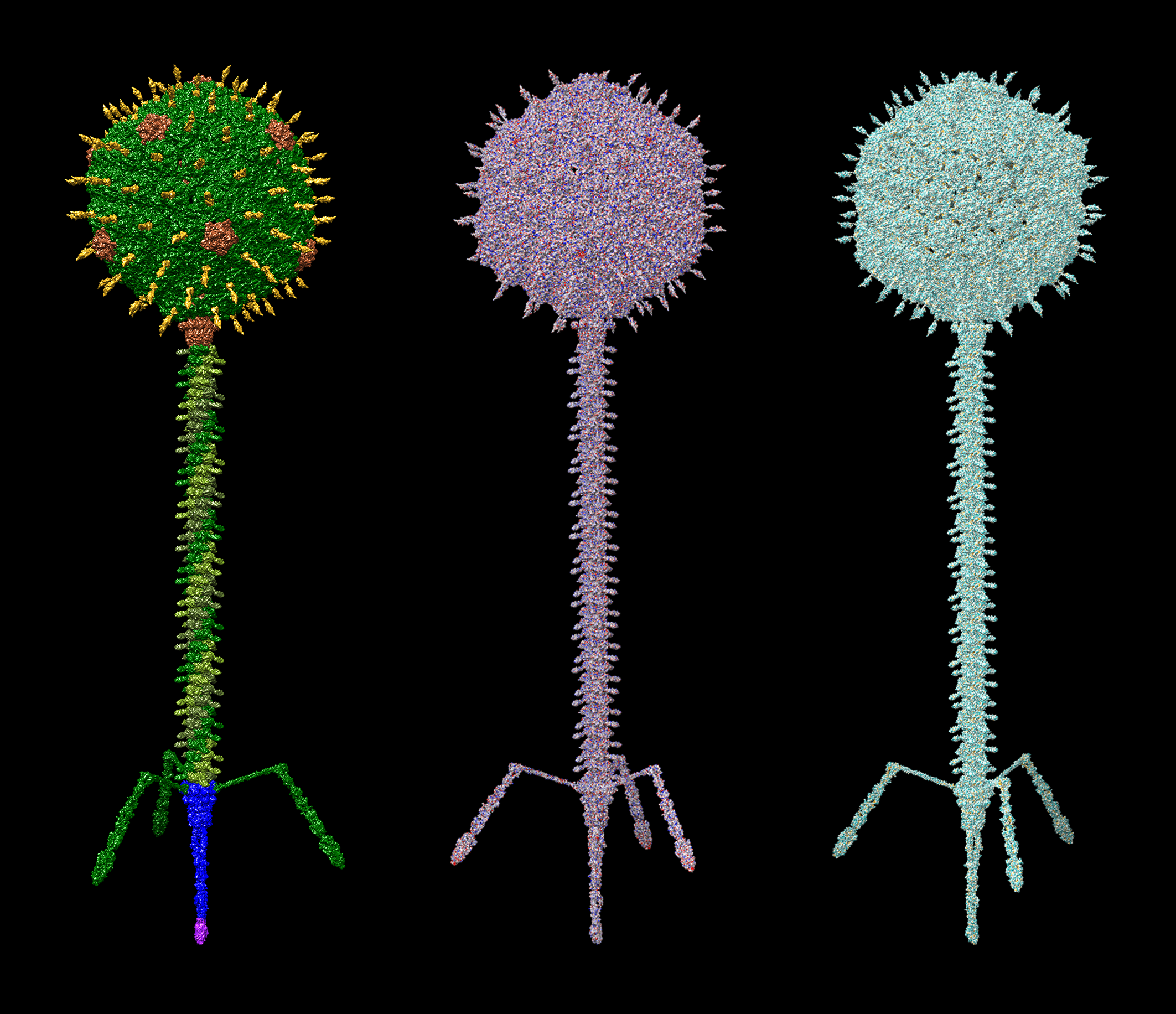
- The structure of bacteriophage T5 at atomic resolution is presented here. From left to right: The Chimera software structure is depicted, the Maestro software electrostatics structure is depicted, and the ChimeraX software hydrophilicity structure is depicted in orange-green.

Virus classification
- (unranked): Virus
- Realm: Duplodnaviria
- Kingdom: Heunggongvirae
- Phylum: Uroviricota
- Class: Caudoviricetes
- Order: Caudovirales (abolished 2021)
- Family: Demerecviridae
- Genus: Tequintavirus
- Species: Tequintavirus T5

Synonyms
- Enterobacteria phage T5; Escherichia phage T5; Escherichia virus T5

= Escherichia virus T5 =

Bacteriophage T5

Species of virus

Bacteriophage T5 is a tailed virus within the family Demerecviridae. This bacteriophage specifically infects E. coli bacterial cells and follows a lytic life cycle.

== Structure and genome ==
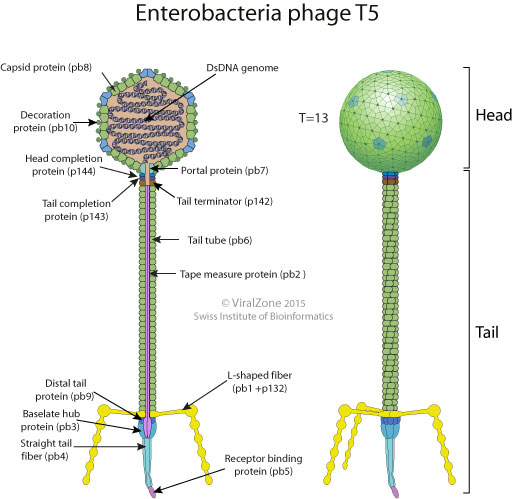
Schematic drawing of an Enterobacteria phage T5 virion (cross section and side view)

The T5 virion includes a 90 nanometer icosahedral capsid (head) and a 160 nanometer-long flexible, non-contractile tail.

The capsid contains the phage's 121,750 base pair, double-stranded DNA genome which is predicted to encode about 162 proteins. The genome has a unique sequence of 111,613 bp with two identical large direct terminal repetitions of 10,139 bp. When the genome sequence was published in 2005, only 61 (36.3%) of the 168 encoded proteins had been assigned functions based on homology to known sequences. More than half of all genes (92 or 54.7%) were predicted ORFs lacking similarity to any known proteins.

== Infection ==
Bacteriophage T5 has been shown to infect E. coli after its receptor binding protein, pb5, binds to the host cell's outer membrane ferrichrome transporter, FhuA. The binding triggers structural changes in pb5 and eventually leads to DNA release from the phage capsid.
