= Nicotianamine synthase =

Class of enzymes

Identifiers
- EC no.: 2.5.1.43
- CAS no.: 161515-44-2

Databases
- IntEnz: IntEnz view
- BRENDA: BRENDA entry
- ExPASy: NiceZyme view
- KEGG: KEGG entry
- MetaCyc: metabolic pathway
- PRIAM: profile
- PDB structures: RCSB PDB PDBe PDBsum
- Gene Ontology: AmiGO / QuickGO
Search
- PMC: articles
- PubMed: articles
- NCBI: proteins

Nicotianamine synthase (EC 2.5.1.43) is an enzyme that catalyzes the chemical reaction

3
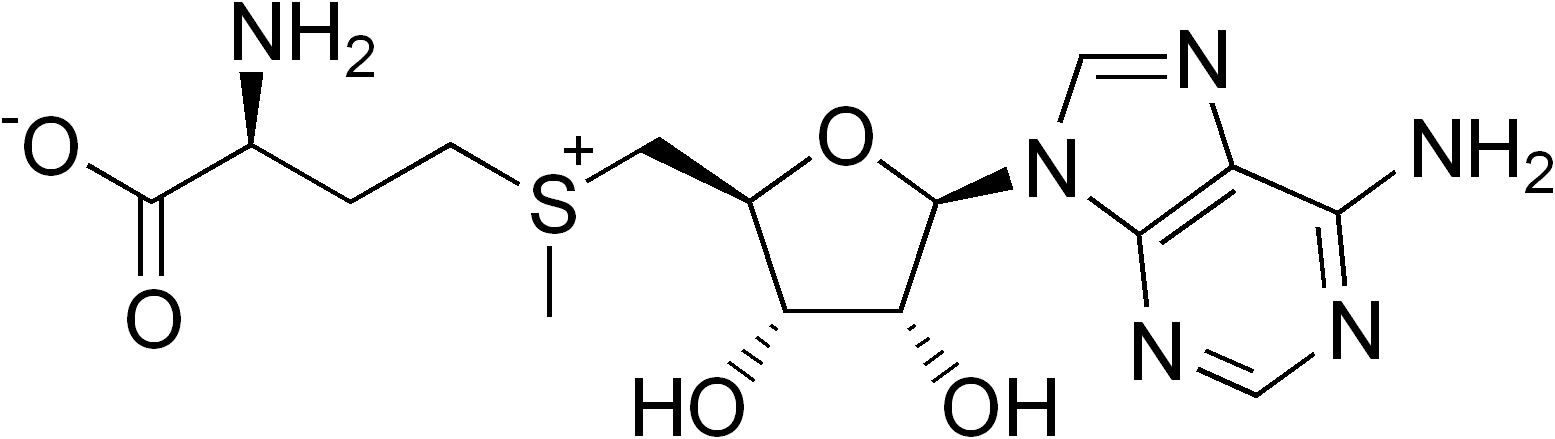
S-Adenosyl methionine
3
5′-Methylthioadenosine
+
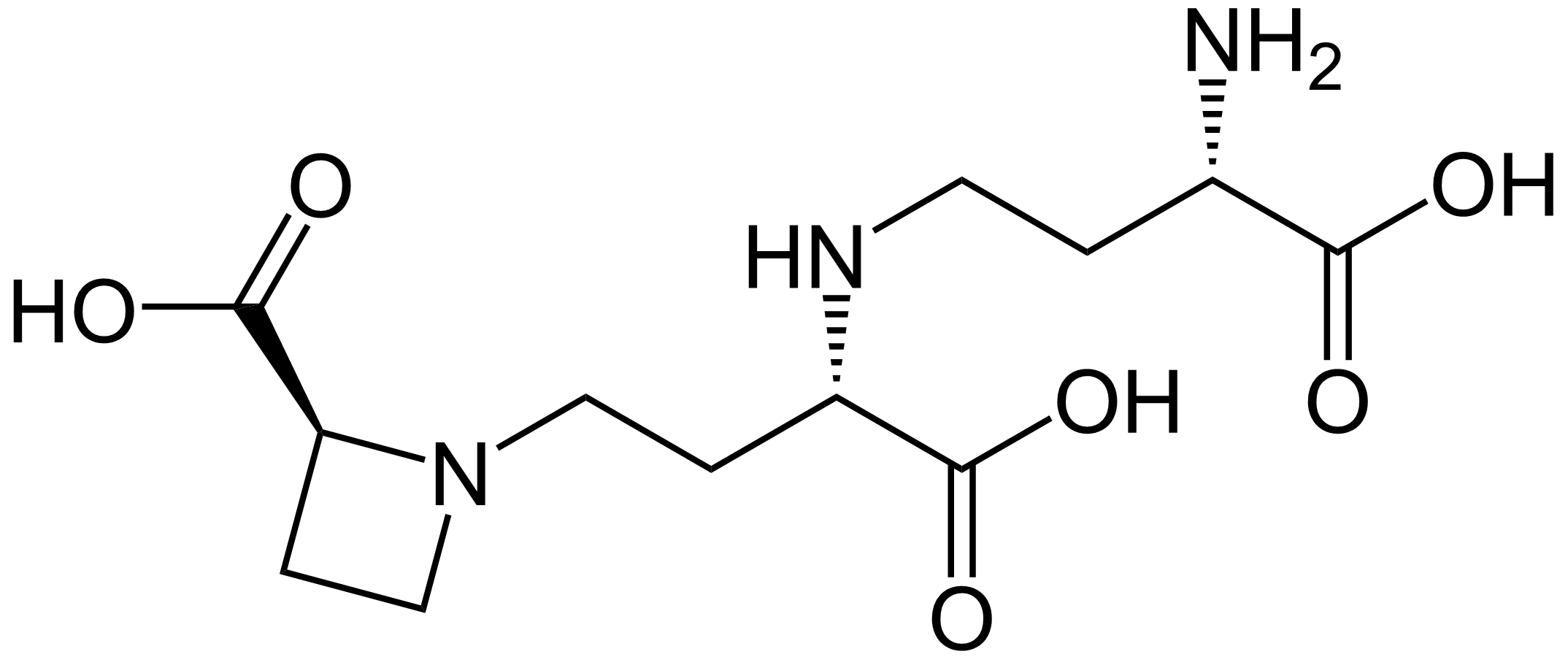
Nicotianamine

The enzyme converts three units of its substrate, S-adenosyl methionine, into nicotianamine and three units of 5′-methylthioadenosine as a by-product.

This enzyme belongs to the family of transferases, specifically those transferring aryl or alkyl groups other than methyl groups. The systematic name of this enzyme class is S-adenosyl-L-methionine:S-adenosyl-L-methionine:S-adenosyl-Lmethioni ne 3-amino-3-carboxypropyltransferase. Nicotianamine is a metal-chelating molecule ubiquitous in higher plants that assists in their uptake of metals from soil.
