= Xanthoferrin =

Siderophore chelating agent

Xanthoferrin is an α-hydroxycarboxylate-type of siderophore produced by xanthomonads. Xanthomonas spp. secrete xanthoferrin to chelate iron under low-iron conditions. The xanthoferrin siderophore mediated iron uptake supports bacterial growth under iron-restricted environment.

== Origin ==
The xanthoferrin term was coined first time for the unique siderophore produced by Xanthomonas campestris pv. campestris 8004, a member of Xanthomonas group of plant pathogens.

== Xanthoferrin producing organisms ==
The xanthoferrin siderophores are reportedly produced by Xanthomonas campestris pathovars, Xanthomonas orayzae pv. oryzae, Xanthomonas citri pathovars, and Xanthomonas oryzae pv. oryzicola. However, the xanthoferrin synthesis genes are conserved throughout the members of Xanthomonas group of plant pathogens and several other bacteria like Vibrio spp. but the xanthoferrin or similar siderophores productions in many of them are yet to be investigated.

== Role of xanthoferrin in virulence ==
The role of xanthoferrin in virulence varies among different Xanthomonas spp. Xanthoferrin mediated iron uptake contributes to the optimum virulence of Xanthomonas oryzicola and Xanthomonas campestris on their respective hosts but does not play any role in the virulence of Xanthomonas oryzae.
