= Bacillibactin =

Names
- Preferred IUPAC name N,N′,N′′-{[(2R,3S,6R,7S,10R,11S)-2,6,10-Trimethyl-4,8,12-trioxo-1,5,9-trioxacyclododecane-3,7,11-triyl]tris[azanediyl(2-oxoethane-2,1-diyl)]}tris(2,3-dihydroxybenzamide)
- Other names Corynebactin

Identifiers
CAS Number	95536-41-7
3D model (JSmol)	Interactive image
ChemSpider	111553
PubChem CID	125349
UNII	36PG6K45CP
CompTox Dashboard (EPA)	DTXSID101045559
- InChI: InChI=1S/C39H42N6O18/c1-16-28(43-25(49)13-40-34(55)19-7-4-10-22(46)31(19)52)37(58)62-18(3)30(45-27(51)15-42-36(57)21-9-6-12-24(48)33(21)54)39(60)63-17(2)29(38(59)61-16)44-26(50)14-41-35(56)20-8-5-11-23(47)32(20)53/h4-12,16-18,28-30,46-48,52-54H,13-15H2,1-3H3,(H,40,55)(H,41,56)(H,42,57)(H,43,49)(H,44,50)(H,45,51)/t16-,17-,18-,28+,29+,30+/m1/s1 Key: RCQTVEFBFUNTGM-BDVHUIKKSA-N; InChI=1/C39H42N6O18/c1-16-28(43-25(49)13-40-34(55)19-7-4-10-22(46)31(19)52)37(58)62-18(3)30(45-27(51)15-42-36(57)21-9-6-12-24(48)33(21)54)39(60)63-17(2)29(38(59)61-16)44-26(50)14-41-35(56)20-8-5-11-23(47)32(20)53/h4-12,16-18,28-30,46-48,52-54H,13-15H2,1-3H3,(H,40,55)(H,41,56)(H,42,57)(H,43,49)(H,44,50)(H,45,51)/t16-,17-,18-,28+,29+,30+/m1/s1 Key: RCQTVEFBFUNTGM-BDVHUIKKBO
- SMILES: C[C@@H]1[C@@H](C(=O)O[C@@H]([C@@H](C(=O)O[C@@H]([C@@H](C(=O)O1)NC(=O)CNC(=O)c2cccc(c2O)O)C)NC(=O)CNC(=O)c3cccc(c3O)O)C)NC(=O)CNC(=O)c4cccc(c4O)O

Properties
Chemical formula	C_{39}H_{42}N_{6}O_{18}
Molar mass	882.789 g·mol^{−1}
- Except where otherwise noted, data are given for materials in their standard state (at 25 °C [77 °F], 100 kPa). Infobox references

Bacillibactin is a catechol-based siderophore secreted by members of the genus Bacillus, including Bacillus anthracis and Bacillus subtilis. It is involved in the chelation of ferric iron (Fe^{3+}) from the surrounding environment and is subsequently transferred into the bacterial cytoplasm via the use of ABC transporters.

== Biosynthesis ==
The biosynthetic pathway of bacillibactin was first identified by May et al. in the Gram-positive B. subtilis. The siderophore is synthesized through multimodular non ribosomal peptide synthetases (NRPS), similar to enterobactin. However, unlike enterobactin, the genes responsible for encoding the bacillibactin synthetases are all located in one operon. This gene cluster is termed dhb – cognate to the catecholic structure of 2,3-dihydroxybenzoate (DHB) – and it can be divided into the specific genes responsible for encoding the enzymes. The three genes are dhbE, dhbB, and dhbF, which get translated into DhbE, DhbB, and DhbF synthetases. Notably, DhbF was characterized as a dimodular NRPS, unlike the monomodular EntF synthetase for enterobactin.

The structure of bacillibactin consists of three 2,3-dihydroxybenzoate (DHB) groups attached to a cyclic amino acid core synthesized by multimodular NRPS. It is the condensation of three DHB-Glycine-Threonine units that ultimately leads to the formation of bacillibactin. In the first step of NRPS, the relevant amino acid is adenylated and transferred to the thiol group of the adjacent synthetases. DhbE is selective for DHB, DhbF1 is selective for glycine, and DhbF2 is selective for threonine. DHB is first adenylated by DhbE and transferred to DhbB's thiol group in the second step of NRPS. Once the relevant compounds are thiolated, the construction of bacillibactin begins.

After DHB is transferred to DhbB, an adjacent synthetase orchestrates the condensation of DHB and glycine onto DhbF1. Then the DHB-Gly unit is further condensed onto the threonine unit on DhbF2, resulting in a DHB-Gly-Thr unit. This process is repeated twice more. However at the end of the third iteration, the hydroxyl group from the first threonine intramolecularly attacks the synthetase-ester bond to create the cyclic amino acid core for bacillibactin.

Biosynthesis of bacillibactin. Acronyms used: A (adenylated), ICL (isochorismate lyase), PCP (peptidyl carrier protein), C (condensation domain), Te (terminal thioesterase)
