= Hydroxamic acid =

Organic compounds of the form –C(=O)N(OH)–

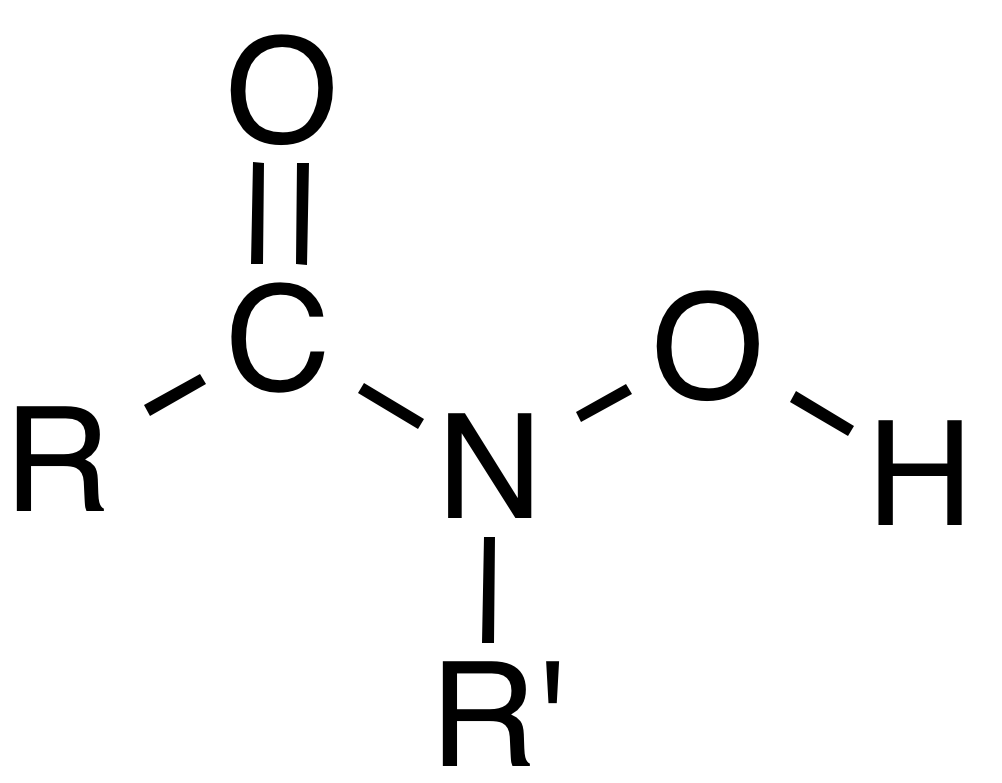
The general structure of a hydroxamic acid

In organic chemistry, hydroxamic acids are a class of organic compounds having a general formula R−C(=O)−N(−OH)−R' bearing the functional group −C(=O)−N(−OH)−, where R and R' are typically organyl groups (e.g., alkyl or aryl) or hydrogen. They are amides (R−C(=O)−NH−R') wherein the nitrogen atom has a hydroxyl (−OH) substituent. They are often used as metal chelators.

Common example of hydroxamic acid is aceto-N-methylhydroxamic acid (H_{3}C−C(=O)−N(−OH)−CH_{3}). Some uncommon examples of hydroxamic acids are formo-N-chlorohydroxamic acid (H−C(=O)−N(−OH)−Cl) and chloroformo-N-methylhydroxamic acid (Cl−C(=O)−N(−OH)−CH_{3}).

== Synthesis and reactions ==
Hydroxamic acids are usually prepared from either esters or acid chlorides by a reaction with hydroxylamine salts. For example, consider the synthesis of benzohydroxamic acid:

C_{6}H_{5}−C(=O)−O−CH_{3} + NH_{2}OH → C_{6}H_{5}−C(=O)−NH−OH + CH_{3}OH

Hydroxamic acids can also be synthesized from aldehydes and N-sulfonylhydroxylamine via the Angeli-Rimini reaction, Alternatively, ferric ions convert aldehydic nitrones (or their hydroxylamine precursors) to hydroxamic acids. Care must be taken not to over-oxidize: the resulting hydroxyimide intermediate (RC(=O)N(OH)C(=O)R′) proceeds immediately to nitrous oxide and the deaminated diacid.

Much like the conversion of ketones to acyloins, molybdenum oxide diperoxide oxidizes trimethylsilated amides to hydroxamic acids, although yields are only about 50%.

In a variation on the Nef reaction, primary nitro compounds kept in an acidic solution (to minimize the nitronate tautomer) hydrolyze to a hydroxamic acid. In base, the reaction requires photoexcitation to the triplet state, and for secondary nitro compounds, the photoreaction proceeds with a Beckmann-like ring expansion.

A well-known reaction of hydroxamic acid esters is the Lossen rearrangement.

== Coordination chemistry and biochemistry ==
Sample gallery

Ferrichrome

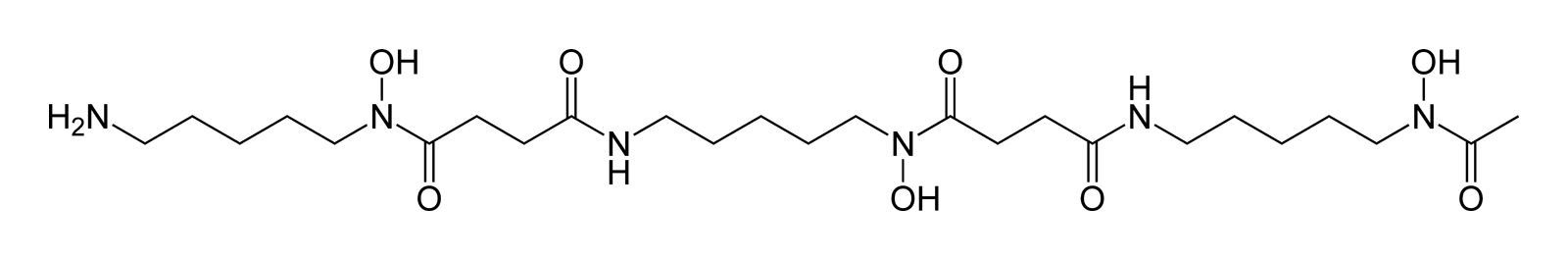
Deferoxamine

Rhodotorulic acid

Fe(III) complex of triacetylfusarinine

The conjugate base of hydroxamic acids forms is called a hydroxamate. Deprotonation occurs at the −N(−OH)− group, with the hydrogen atom being removed, resulting in a hydroxamate anion R−C(=O)−N(−O^{−})−R'. The resulting conjugate base presents the metal with an anionic, conjugated O,O chelating ligand. Many hydroxamic acids and many iron hydroxamates have been isolated from natural sources.

They function as ligands, usually for iron. Nature has evolved families of hydroxamic acids to function as iron-binding compounds (siderophores) in bacteria. They extract iron(III) from otherwise insoluble sources (rust, minerals, etc.). The resulting complexes are transported into the cell, where the iron is extracted and utilized metabolically.

Ligands derived from hydroxamic acid and thiohydroxamic acid (a hydroxamic acid where one or both oxygens in the −C(=O)−N(−OH)− functional group are replaced by sulfur) also form strong complexes with lead(II).

== Other uses and occurrences ==
Hydroxamic acids are used extensively in flotation of rare earth minerals during the concentration and extraction of ores to be subjected to further processing.

Some hydroxamic acids (e.g. vorinostat, belinostat, panobinostat, and trichostatin A) are HDAC inhibitors with anti-cancer properties. The hydroxamic acid functionality has been proposed to directly bind a zinc atom in the acetyl lysine binding pocket. Fosmidomycin is a natural hydroxamic acid inhibitor of 1-deoxy-D-xylulose-5-phosphate reductoisomerase (DXP reductoisomerase). Hydroxamic acids have also been investigated for reprocessing of irradiated fuel.
