= Nicotianamine =

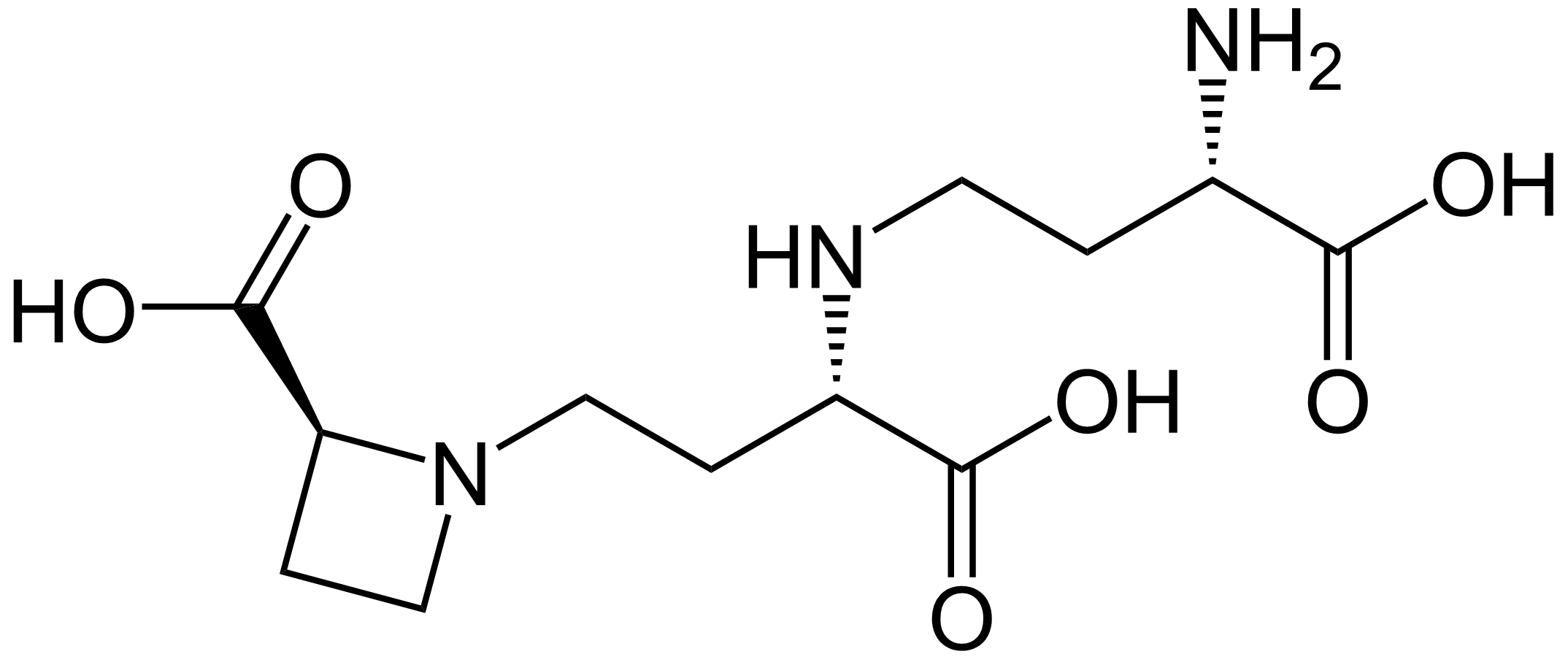

Names
- Systematic IUPAC name (2S)-1-[(3S)-3-{[(3S)-3-Amino-3-carboxypropyl]amino}-3-carboxypropyl]azetidine-2-carboxylic acid

Identifiers
CAS Number	34441-14-0
3D model (JSmol)	Interactive image
ChEBI	CHEBI:17721
ChemSpider	8058557
KEGG	C05324
PubChem CID	9882882
UNII	2OGX6YHQ1F
CompTox Dashboard (EPA)	DTXSID8037677
- InChI: InChI=1S/C12H21N3O6/c13-7(10(16)17)1-4-14-8(11(18)19)2-5-15-6-3-9(15)12(20)21/h7-9,14H,1-6,13H2,(H,16,17)(H,18,19)(H,20,21)/t7-,8-,9-/m0/s1 Key: KRGPXXHMOXVMMM-CIUDSAMLSA-N
- SMILES: C1CN([C@@H]1C(=O)O)CC[C@@H](C(=O)O)NCC[C@@H](C(=O)O)N

Properties
Chemical formula	C_{12}H_{21}N_{3}O_{6}
Molar mass	303.31164 g/mol
- Except where otherwise noted, data are given for materials in their standard state (at 25 °C [77 °F], 100 kPa). Infobox references

Nicotianamine is a metal-chelating molecule ubiquitous in higher plants. It is also used as a precursor for the synthesis of phytosiderophores which play a key role in iron uptake from the soil in graminaceous plants. Biochemically, it is synthesized by the enzyme nicotianamine synthase, which uses three molecules of S-adenosylmethionine.

== Biosynthesis ==
The enzyme nicotianamine synthase converts three units of its substrate, S-adenosyl methionine, into nicotianamine and three units of 5′-methylthioadenosine as a by-product.

3
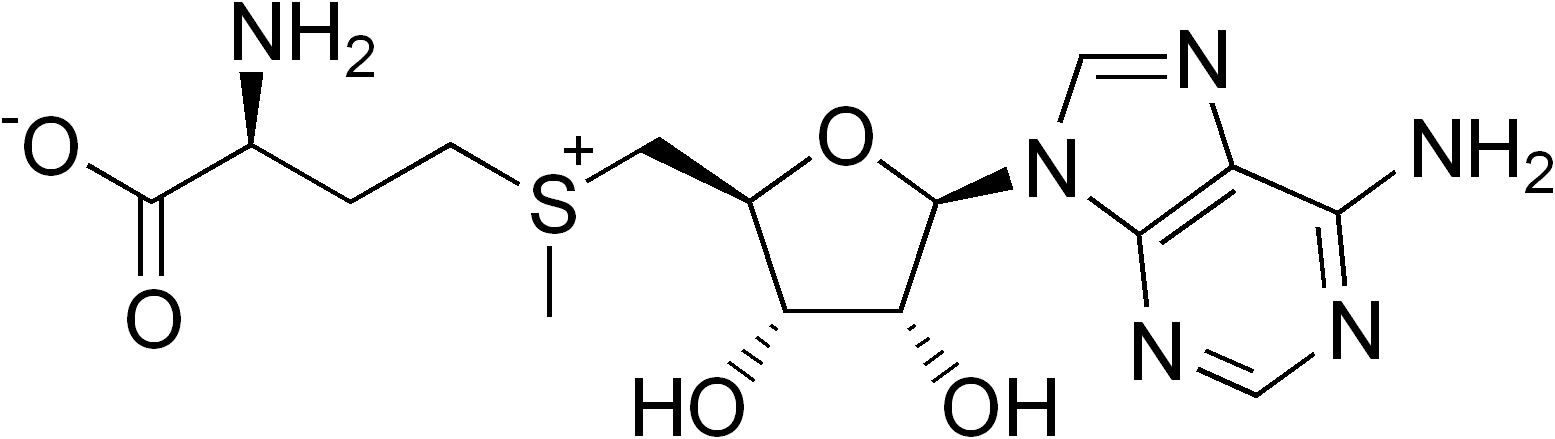
S-Adenosyl methionine
3
5′-Methylthioadenosine
+
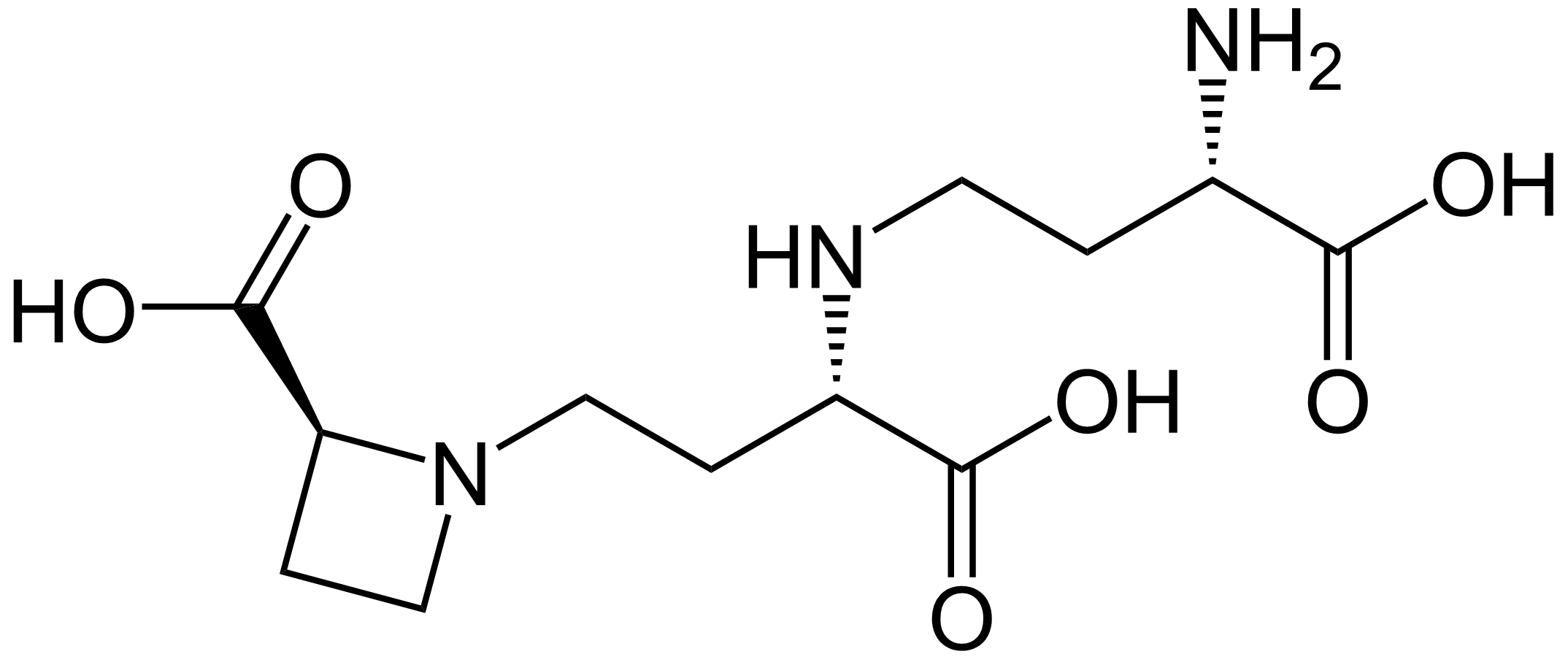
Nicotianamine

== Metabolism ==
Nicotianamine binds efficiently to iron II but much less well to the iron III mainly found in soil. Plants convert it into other phytosiderophores which are more efficient in scavenging iron III and other ions. For example, the enzymes nicotianamine aminotransferase (NAAT) and 3''-deamino-3''-oxonicotianamine reductase (DOR) give two additional compounds:

nicotianamine
NAAT
3"-deamino-3"-oxonicotianamine
DOR
2'-deoxymugineic acid

Further additions of hydroxyl groups, catalysed by alpha-ketoglutarate-dependent hydroxylases, convert 2'-deoxymugineic acid to mugineic acid and related phytosiderophores.
