= Aerobactin =

Names
- Preferred IUPAC name (8S,16S)-3,12,21-Trihydroxy-2,10,14,22-tetraoxo-3,9,15,21-tetraazatricosane-8,12,16-tricarboxylic acid

Identifiers
CAS Number	26198-65-2
3D model (JSmol)	Interactive image
ChEBI	CHEBI:18157
ChemSpider	110318
PubChem CID	123762
CompTox Dashboard (EPA)	DTXSID90904341
- InChI: InChI=1S/C22H36N4O13/c1-13(27)25(38)9-5-3-7-15(19(31)32)23-17(29)11-22(37,21(35)36)12-18(30)24-16(20(33)34)8-4-6-10-26(39)14(2)28/h15-16,37-39H,3-12H2,1-2H3,(H,23,29)(H,24,30)(H,31,32)(H,33,34)(H,35,36)/t15-,16-/m0/s1 Key: KDHHWXGBNUCREU-HOTGVXAUSA-N; InChI=1/C22H36N4O13/c1-13(27)25(38)9-5-3-7-15(19(31)32)23-17(29)11-22(37,21(35)36)12-18(30)24-16(20(33)34)8-4-6-10-26(39)14(2)28/h15-16,37-39H,3-12H2,1-2H3,(H,23,29)(H,24,30)(H,31,32)(H,33,34)(H,35,36)/t15-,16-/m0/s1 Key: KDHHWXGBNUCREU-HOTGVXAUBP
- SMILES: CC(=O)N(CCCC[C@@H](C(=O)O)NC(=O)CC(CC(=O)N[C@@H](CCCCN(C(=O)C)O)C(=O)O)(C(=O)O)O)O

Properties
Chemical formula	C_{22}H_{36}N_{4}O_{13}
Molar mass	564.545 g·mol^{−1}
- Except where otherwise noted, data are given for materials in their standard state (at 25 °C [77 °F], 100 kPa). Infobox references

Aerobactin is a bacterial iron chelating agent (siderophore) found in E. coli and other Enterobacteriaceae species. It is a virulence factor enabling E. coli to sequester iron in iron-poor environments such as the urinary tract.

Aerobactin is biosynthesized by the oxidation of lysine, catalyzed by the enzyme aerobactin synthase, which is then coupled to citric acid. The gene for this enzyme is found in the aerobactin operon, which is roughly 8 kilobases long and contains 5 or more genes in total.

Yersinia pestis contains genes relating to aerobactin, but they have been inactivated by a frameshift mutation, thus Y. pestis is no longer able to synthesize aerobactin.

== Other homologs ==
- Rhizobactin from Sinorhizobium
- Alcaligin from Bordetella
