= Enterobactin =

Names
- Preferred IUPAC name N,N′,N′′-[(3S,7S,11S)-2,6,10-Trioxo-1,5,9-trioxacyclododecane-3,7,11-triyl]tris(2,3-dihydroxybenzamide)

Identifiers
CAS Number	28384-96-5
3D model (JSmol)	Interactive image; Interactive image
ChEBI	CHEBI:28855
ChEMBL	ChEMBL432995
ChemSpider	31543
PubChem CID	34231
UNII	35C9R2N24F
CompTox Dashboard (EPA)	DTXSID40182617
- InChI: InChI=1S/C30H27N3O15/c34-19-7-1-4-13(22(19)37)25(40)31-16-10-46-29(44)18(33-27(42)15-6-3-9-21(36)24(15)39)12-48-30(45)17(11-47-28(16)43)32-26(41)14-5-2-8-20(35)23(14)38/h1-9,16-18,34-39H,10-12H2,(H,31,40)(H,32,41)(H,33,42)/t16-,17-,18-/m0/s1 Key: SERBHKJMVBATSJ-BZSNNMDCSA-N; InChI=1/C30H27N3O15/c34-19-7-1-4-13(22(19)37)25(40)31-16-10-46-29(44)18(33-27(42)15-6-3-9-21(36)24(15)39)12-48-30(45)17(11-47-28(16)43)32-26(41)14-5-2-8-20(35)23(14)38/h1-9,16-18,34-39H,10-12H2,(H,31,40)(H,32,41)(H,33,42)/t16-,17-,18-/m0/s1 Key: SERBHKJMVBATSJ-BZSNNMDCBT
- SMILES: C1C(C(=O)OCC(C(=O)OCC(C(=O)O1)NC(=O)C2=C(C(=CC=C2)O)O)NC(=O)C3=C(C(=CC=C3)O)O)NC(=O)C4=C(C(=CC=C4)O)O; c1cc(c(c(c1)O)O)C(=O)N[C@H]2COC(=O)[C@H](COC(=O)[C@H](COC2=O)NC(=O)c3cccc(c3O)O)NC(=O)c4cccc(c4O)O

Properties
Chemical formula	C_{30}H_{27}N_{3}O_{15}
Molar mass	669.55 g/mol
- Except where otherwise noted, data are given for materials in their standard state (at 25 °C [77 °F], 100 kPa). verify (what is ?) Infobox references

Enterobactin (also known as enterochelin) is a high affinity siderophore that acquires iron for microbial systems. It is primarily found in Gram-negative bacteria, such as Escherichia coli and Salmonella typhimurium.

Enterobactin is the strongest siderophore known, binding to the ferric ion (Fe^{3+}) with affinity K = 10^{52} M^{−1}. This value is substantially larger than even some synthetic metal chelators, such as EDTA (K_{f}_{,Fe^{3+}} ~ 10^{25} M^{−1}). Due to its high affinity, enterobactin is capable of chelating even in environments where the concentration of ferric ion is held very low, such as within living organisms. Pathogenic bacteria can steal iron from other living organisms using this mechanism, even though the concentration of iron is kept extremely low due to the toxicity of free iron.

== Structure and biosynthesis ==
Chorismic acid, an aromatic amino acid precursor, is converted to 2,3-dihydroxybenzoic acid (DHB) by a series of enzymes, EntA, EntB and EntC. An amide linkage of DHB to L-serine is then catalyzed by EntD, EntE, EntF and EntB. Three molecules of the DHB-Ser formed undergo intermolecular cyclization, yielding enterobactin. Although a number of stereoisomers are possible due to the chirality of the serine residues, only the Δ-cis isomer is metabolically active. The first three-dimensional structure of a metal enterobactin complex was determined as the vanadium(IV) complex. Although ferric enterobactin long eluded crystallization, its definitive three-dimensional structure was ultimately obtained using racemic crystallography, in which crystals of a 1:1 mixture of ferric enterobactin and its mirror image (ferric enantioenterobactin) were grown and analyzed by X-ray crystallography.

Synthesis of enterobactin starting from chorismate

== Mechanism ==
Iron deficiency in bacterial cells triggers secretion of enterobactin into the extracellular environment, causing formation of a coordination complex "FeEnt" wherein ferric (3+) iron is chelated to the conjugate base of enterobactin. In Escherichia coli, FepA in the bacterial outer membrane then allows entrance of FeEnt to the bacterial periplasm. FepB, C, D and G all participate in transport of the FeEnt through the inner membrane by means of an ATP-binding cassette transporter.

Due to the extreme iron binding affinity of enterobactin, it is necessary to cleave FeEnt with ferrienterobactin esterase to remove the iron. This degradation yields three 2,3-dihydroxybenzoyl-L-serine units. Reduction of the iron (Fe^{3+} to Fe^{2+}) occurs in conjunction with this cleavage, but no FeEnt bacterial reductase enzyme has been identified, and the mechanism for this process is still unclear. The reduction potential for Fe^{3+}/Fe^{2+}–enterobactin complex is pH dependent and varies from −0.57 V (vs NHE) at pH 6 to −0.79 V at pH 7.4 to −0.99 at pH values higher than 10.4.

Enterobactin has also been shown to have roles in the host, including mammals. Enterobactin is considered a hallmark for pathogenic infection that is sequestered by mammalian protein lipocalin 2 in an attempt to starve the infectious bacteria for iron. In contrast, it has also been shown that supplementation with both Ent and FeEnt can benefit the host directly and promote iron uptake in C. elegans and mammalian cultured cells.

== History ==
Enterobactin was discovered by Gibson and Neilands groups in 1970. These initial studies established the structure and its relationship to 2,3-dihydroxybenzoic acid.
