= Siderophore =

Iron-carrying compounds

Structure of the siderophore triacetylfusarinine encapsulating iron(III) within a tris(hydroxamate) coordination sphere (color code: red = oxygen, gray = carbon, blue = nitrogen, dark blue = iron).

Siderophores (Greek: "iron carrier") are small, high-affinity iron-chelating compounds that are secreted by microorganisms such as bacteria and fungi. They help the organism accumulate iron. Although a widening range of siderophore functions is being appreciated, siderophores are among the strongest known (highest affinity) Fe^{3+} binding agents. Phytosiderophores are siderophores produced by plants.

== Scarcity of soluble iron ==
Despite being one of the most abundant elements in the Earth's crust, iron is not readily bioavailable. In most aerobic environments, such as the soil or sea, iron exists in the ferric (Fe^{3+}) state, which tends to form insoluble rust-like solids. To be effective, nutrients must not only be available, they must be soluble. Microbes release siderophores to scavenge iron from these mineral phases by formation of soluble Fe^{3+} complexes that can be taken up by active transport mechanisms. Many siderophores are nonribosomal peptides, although several are biosynthesised independently.

Siderophores are also important for some pathogenic bacteria for their acquisition of iron. In mammalian hosts, iron is tightly bound to proteins such as hemoglobin, transferrin, lactoferrin and ferritin. The strict homeostasis of iron leads to a free concentration of about 10^{−24} mol L^{−1}, hence there are great evolutionary pressures put on pathogenic bacteria to obtain this metal. For example, the anthrax pathogen Bacillus anthracis releases two siderophores, bacillibactin and petrobactin, to scavenge ferric ion from iron containing proteins. While bacillibactin has been shown to bind to the immune system protein siderocalin, petrobactin is assumed to evade the immune system and has been shown to be important for virulence in mice.

Siderophores are amongst the strongest binders to Fe^{3+} known, with enterobactin being one of the strongest of these. Because of this property, they have attracted interest from medical science in metal chelation therapy, with the siderophore desferrioxamine B gaining widespread use in treatments for iron poisoning and thalassemia.

Besides siderophores, some pathogenic bacteria produce hemophores (heme binding scavenging proteins) or have receptors that bind directly to iron/heme proteins. In eukaryotes, other strategies to enhance iron solubility and uptake are the acidification of the surroundings (e.g. used by plant roots) or the extracellular reduction of Fe^{3+} into the more soluble Fe^{2+} ions.

== Structure ==
Siderophores usually form a stable, hexadentate, octahedral complex preferentially with Fe^{3+} compared to other naturally occurring abundant metal ions, although if there are fewer than six donor atoms water can also coordinate. The most effective siderophores are those that have three bidentate ligands per molecule, forming a hexadentate complex and causing a smaller entropic change than that caused by chelating a single ferric ion with separate ligands. Fe^{3+} is a strong Lewis acid, preferring strong Lewis bases such as anionic or neutral oxygen atoms to coordinate with. Microbes usually release the iron from the siderophore by reduction to Fe^{2+} which has little affinity to these ligands.

Siderophores are usually classified by the ligands used to chelate the ferric iron. The major groups of siderophores include the catecholates (phenolates), hydroxamates and carboxylates (e.g. derivatives of citric acid). Citric acid can also act as a siderophore. The wide variety of siderophores may be due to evolutionary pressures placed on microbes to produce structurally different siderophores which cannot be transported by other microbes' specific active transport systems, or in the case of pathogens deactivated by the host organism.

== Diversity ==
Examples of siderophores produced by various bacteria and fungi:

Ferrichrome, a hydroxamate siderophore

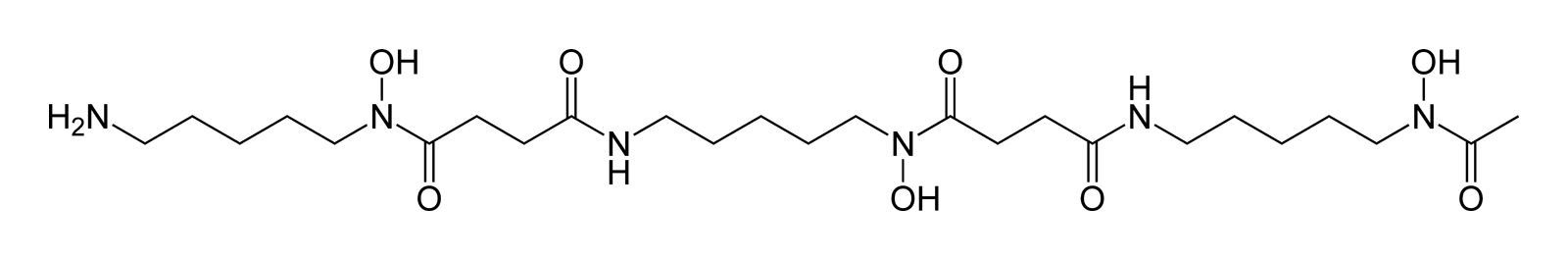
Desferrioxamine B, a hydroxamate siderophore

Enterobactin, a catecholate siderophore

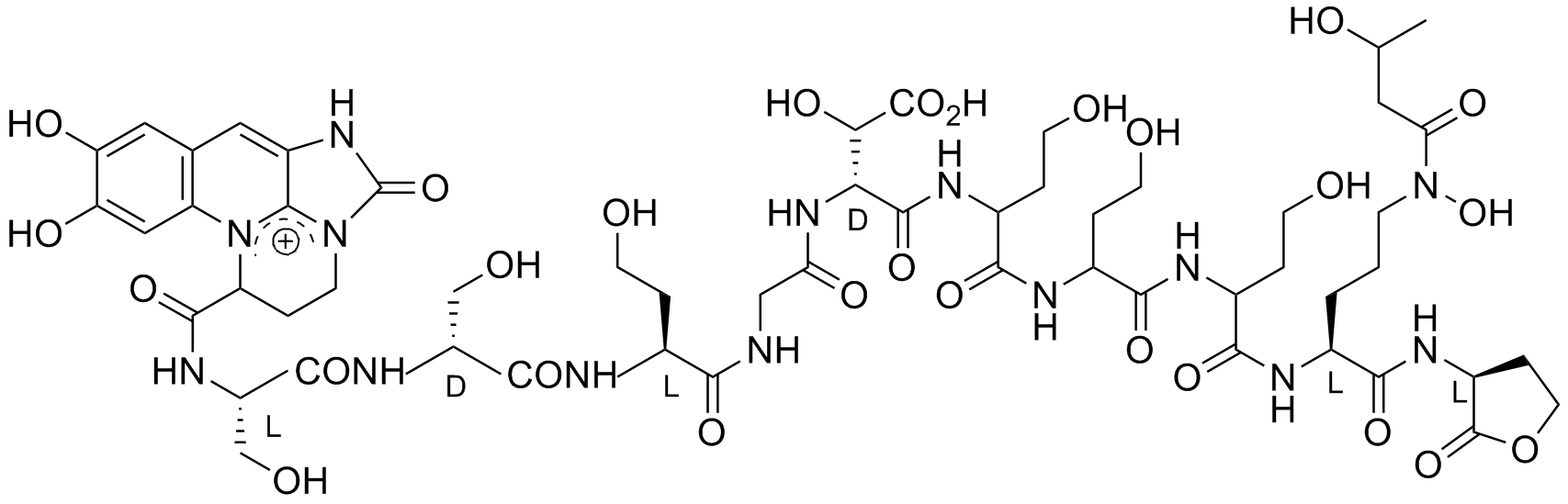
Azotobactin, a mixed-ligand siderophore

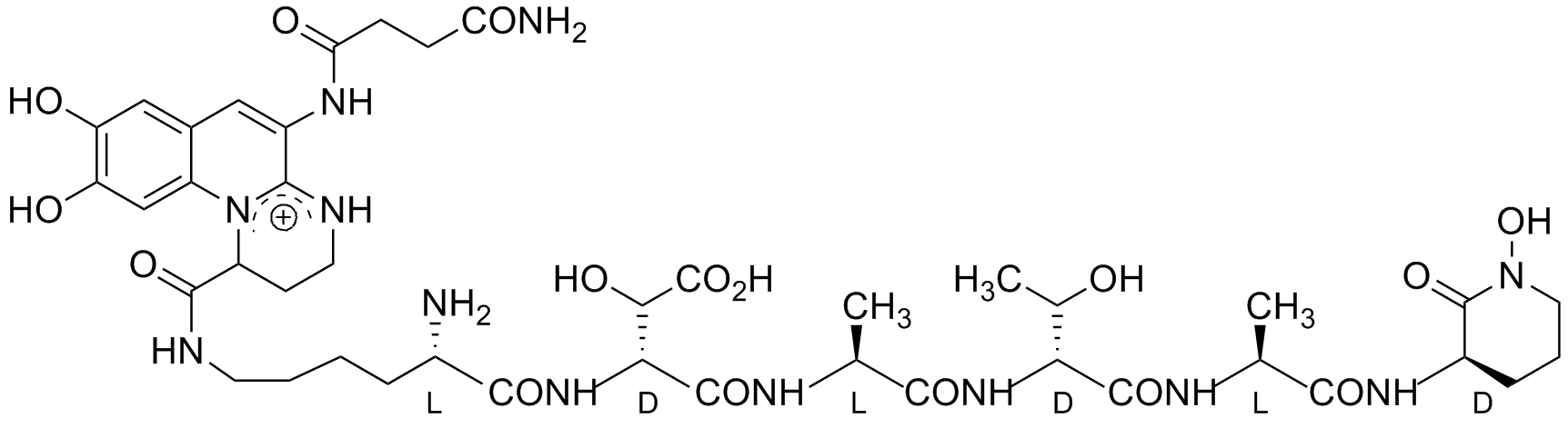
Pyoverdine, a mixed-ligand siderophore

Yersiniabactin, a mixed-ligand siderophore

Hydroxamate siderophores

Siderophore	Organism
ferrichrome	Ustilago sphaerogena
desferrioxamine B (deferoxamine)	Streptomyces pilosus Streptomyces coelicolor
desferrioxamine E	Streptomyces coelicolor
fusarinine C	Fusarium roseum
ornibactin	Burkholderia cepacia
rhodotorulic acid	Rhodotorula pilimanae
coprogen	fungi
aerobactin	Escherichia coli

Catecholate siderophores

Siderophore	Organism
enterobactin	Escherichia coli enteric bacteria
bacillibactin	Bacillus subtilis Bacillus anthracis
vibriobactin	Vibrio cholerae
mycobactin	Mycobacterium tuberculosis
salmochelin	Salmonella sp.

Mixed ligands

Siderophore	Organism
azotobactin	Azotobacter vinelandii
pyoverdine	Pseudomonas aeruginosa
yersiniabactin	Yersinia pestis

Amino carboxylate ligands

Siderophore	Organism
Mugineic acid	Hordeum vulgare barley
Nicotianamine	rice

A comprehensive list of siderophore structures (over 250) is presented in Appendix 1 in reference.

== Biological function ==
=== Bacteria and fungi ===
In response to iron limitation in their environment, genes involved in microbe siderophore production and uptake are derepressed, leading to manufacture of siderophores and the appropriate uptake proteins. In bacteria, Fe^{2+}-dependent repressors bind to DNA upstream to genes involved in siderophore production at high intracellular iron concentrations. At low concentrations, Fe^{2+} dissociates from the repressor, which in turn dissociates from the DNA, leading to transcription of the genes. In gram-negative and AT-rich gram-positive bacteria, this is usually regulated by the Fur (ferric uptake regulator) repressor, whilst in GC-rich gram-positive bacteria (e.g. Actinomycetota) it is DtxR (diphtheria toxin repressor), so-called as the production of the dangerous diphtheria toxin by Corynebacterium diphtheriae is also regulated by this system.

This is followed by excretion of the siderophore into the extracellular environment, where the siderophore acts to sequester and solubilize the iron. Siderophores are then recognized by cell specific receptors on the outer membrane of the cell. In fungi and other eukaryotes, the Fe-siderophore complex may be extracellularly reduced to Fe^{2+}, while in many cases the whole Fe-siderophore complex is actively transported across the cell membrane. In gram-negative bacteria, these are transported into the periplasm via TonB-dependent receptors, and are transferred into the cytoplasm by ABC transporters.

Once in the cytoplasm of the cell, the Fe^{3+}-siderophore complex is usually reduced to Fe^{2+} to release the iron, especially in the case of "weaker" siderophore ligands such as hydroxamates and carboxylates. Siderophore decomposition or other biological mechanisms can also release iron, especially in the case of catecholates such as ferric-enterobactin, whose reduction potential is too low for reducing agents such as flavin adenine dinucleotide, hence enzymatic degradation is needed to release the iron.

=== Plants ===
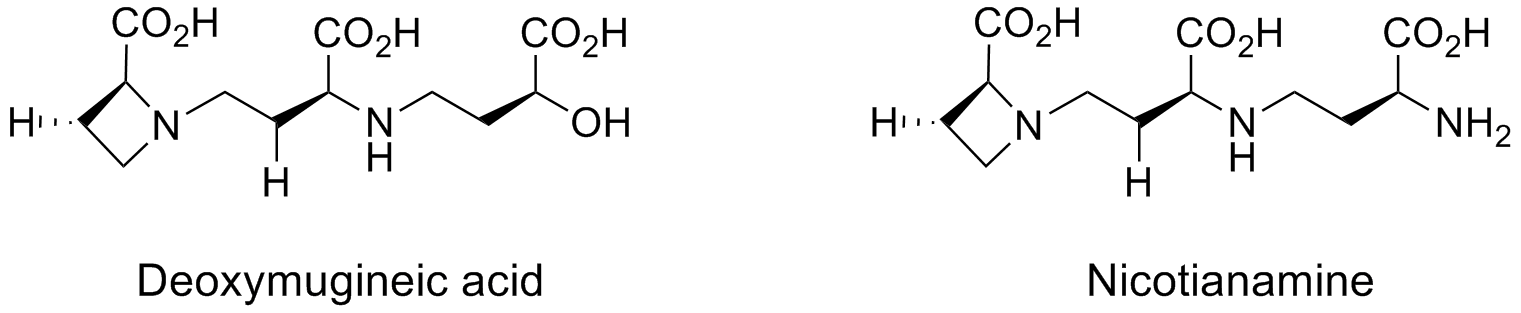
Deoxymugineic acid, a phytosiderophore.

Although there is sufficient iron in most soils for plant growth, plant iron deficiency is a problem in calcareous soil, due to the low solubility of iron(III) hydroxide. Calcareous soil accounts for 30% of the world's farmland. Under such conditions graminaceous plants (grasses, cereals and rice) secrete phytosiderophores into the soil, a typical example being deoxymugineic acid. Phytosiderophores have a different structure to those of fungal and bacterial siderophores having two α-aminocarboxylate binding centres, together with a single α-hydroxycarboxylate unit. This latter bidentate function provides phytosiderophores with a high selectivity for iron(III). When grown in an iron -deficient soil, roots of graminaceous plants secrete siderophores into the rhizosphere. On scavenging iron(III) the iron–phytosiderophore complex is transported across the cytoplasmic membrane using a proton symport mechanism. The iron(III) complex is then reduced to iron(II) and the iron is transferred to nicotianamine, which although very similar to the phytosiderophores is selective for iron(II) and is not secreted by the roots. Nicotianamine translocates iron in phloem to all plant parts.

=== Chelating in Pseudomonas aeruginosa ===
Iron is an important nutrient for the bacterium Pseudomonas aeruginosa, however, iron is not easily accessible in the environment. To overcome this problem, P. aeruginosa produces siderophores to bind and transport iron. But the bacterium that produced the siderophores does not necessarily receive the direct benefit of iron intake. Rather all members of the cellular population are equally likely to access the iron-siderophore complexes. The production of siderophores also requires the bacterium to expend energy. Thus, siderophore production can be looked at as an altruistic trait because it is beneficial for the local group but costly for the individual. This altruistic dynamic requires every member of the cellular population to equally contribute to siderophore production. But at times mutations can occur that result in some bacteria producing lower amounts of siderophore. These mutations give an evolutionary advantage because the bacterium can benefit from siderophore production without suffering the energy cost. Thus, more energy can be allocated to growth. Members of the cellular population that can efficiently produce these siderophores are commonly referred to as cooperators; members that produce little to no siderophores are often referred to as cheaters. Research has shown when cooperators and cheaters are grown together, cooperators have a decrease in fitness while cheaters have an increase in fitness. It is observed that the magnitude of change in fitness increases with increasing iron-limitation. With an increase in fitness, the cheaters can outcompete the cooperators; this leads to an overall decrease in fitness of the group, due to lack of sufficient siderophore production.

=== Pyoverdine and siderophore production in Pseudomonas aeruginosa ===
In a recent study, the production of pyoverdine (PVD), a type of siderophore, in the bacterium Pseudomonas aeruginosa has been explored. This study focused on the construction, modeling, and dynamic simulation of PVD biosynthesis, a virulence factor, through a systemic approach. This approach considers that the metabolic pathway of PVD synthesis is regulated by the phenomenon of quorum-sensing (QS), a cellular communication system that allows bacteria to coordinate their behavior based on their population density.

The study showed that as bacterial growth increases, so does the extracellular concentration of QS signaling molecules, thus emulating the natural behavior of P. aeruginosa PAO1. To carry out this study, a metabolic network model of P. aeruginosa was built based on the iMO1056 model, the genomic annotation of the P. aeruginosa PAO1 strain, and the metabolic pathway of PVD synthesis. This model included the synthesis of PVD, transport reactions, exchange, and QS signaling molecules.

The resulting model, called CCBM1146, showed that the QS phenomenon directly influences the metabolism of P. aeruginosa towards the biosynthesis of PVD as a function of the change in QS signal intensity. This work is the first in silico report of an integrative model that comprises the QS gene regulatory network and the metabolic network of P. aeruginosa, providing a detailed view of how the production of pyoverdine and siderophores in Pseudomonas aeruginosa are influenced by the quorum-sensing phenomenon

Furthermore, intratumor P. aeruginosa may scavenge iron by producing pyoverdine, which indirectly protect tumor cells from ferroptosis ('iron death'), emphasizing the need for ferroptosis inducers (thiostrepton) for cancer treatment.

== Ecology ==
Siderophores become important in the ecological niche defined by low iron availability, iron being one of the critical growth limiting factors for virtually all aerobic microorganisms. There are four major ecological habitats: soil and surface water, marine water, plant tissue (pathogens) and animal tissue (pathogens).

=== Soil and surface water ===
The soil is a rich source of bacterial and fungal genera. Common Gram-positive species are those belonging to the Actinomycetales and species of the genera Bacillus, Arthrobacter and Nocardia. Many of these organisms produce and secrete ferrioxamines which lead to growth promotion of not only the producing organisms, but also other microbial populations that are able to utilize exogenous siderophores. Soil fungi include Aspergillus and Penicillium predominantly produce ferrichromes. This group of siderophores consist of cyclic hexapeptides and consequently are highly resistant to environmental degradation associated with the wide range of hydrolytic enzymes that are present in humic soil. Soils containing decaying plant material possess pH values as low as 3–4. Under such conditions organisms that produce hydroxamate siderophores have an advantage due to the extreme acid stability of these molecules. The microbial population of fresh water is similar to that of soil, indeed many bacteria are washed out from the soil. In addition, fresh-water lakes contain large populations of Pseudomonas, Azomonas, Aeromonas and Alcaligenes species. As siderophores are secreted into the surroundings, siderophores can be detected by bacterivorous predators, including Caenorhabditis elegans, resulting in the nematode migration to the bacterial prey.

=== Marine water ===
In contrast to most fresh-water sources, iron levels in surface sea-water are extremely low (1 nM to 1 μM in the upper 200 m) and much lower than those of V, Cr, Co, Ni, Cu and Zn. Virtually all this iron is in the iron(III) state and complexed to organic ligands. These low levels of iron limit the primary production of phytoplankton and have led to the Iron Hypothesis where it was proposed that an influx of iron would promote phytoplankton growth and thereby reduce atmospheric CO_{2}. This hypothesis has been tested on more than 10 different occasions and in all cases, massive blooms resulted. However, the blooms persisted for variable periods of time. An interesting observation made in some of these studies was that the concentration of the organic ligands increased over a short time span in order to match the concentration of added iron, thus implying biological origin and in view of their affinity for iron possibly being of a siderophore or siderophore-like nature. Significantly, heterotrophic bacteria were also found to markedly increase in number in the iron-induced blooms. Thus there is the element of synergism between phytoplankton and heterotrophic bacteria. Phytoplankton require iron (provided by bacterial siderophores), and heterotrophic bacteria require non-CO_{2} carbon sources (provided by phytoplankton).

The dilute nature of the pelagic marine environment promotes large diffusive losses and renders the efficiency of the normal siderophore-based iron uptake strategies problematic. However, many heterotrophic marine bacteria do produce siderophores, albeit with properties different from those produced by terrestrial organisms. Many marine siderophores are surface-active and tend to form molecular aggregates, for example aquachelins. The presence of the fatty acyl chain renders the molecules with a high surface activity and an ability to form micelles. Thus, when secreted, these molecules bind to surfaces and to each other, thereby slowing the rate of diffusion away from the secreting organism and maintaining a relatively high local siderophore concentration. Phytoplankton have high iron requirements and yet the majority (and possibly all) do not produce siderophores. Phytoplankton can, however, obtain iron from siderophore complexes by the aid of membrane-bound reductases and certainly from iron(II) generated via photochemical decomposition of iron(III) siderophores. Thus a large proportion of iron (possibly all iron) absorbed by phytoplankton is dependent on bacterial siderophore production.

=== Plant pathogens ===
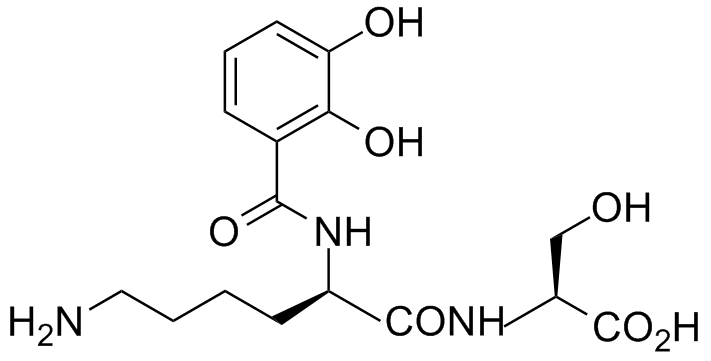
Chrysobactin

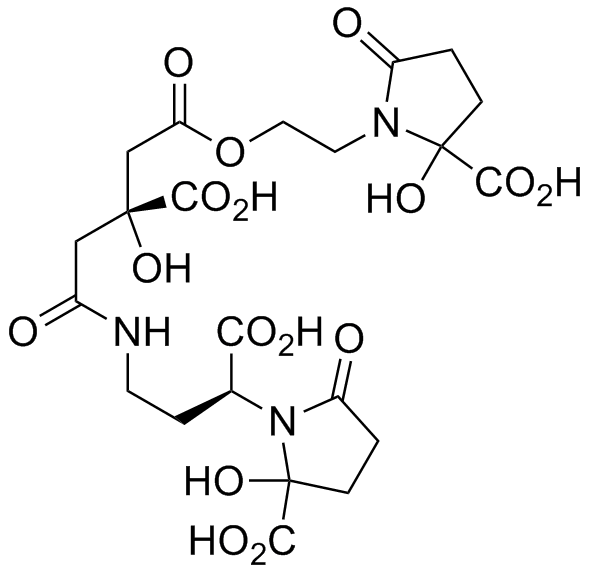
Achromobactin

Most plant pathogens invade the apoplasm by releasing pectolytic enzymes which facilitate the spread of the invading organism. Bacteria frequently infect plants by gaining entry to the tissue via the stomata. Having entered the plant they spread and multiply in the intercellular spaces. With bacterial vascular diseases, the infection is spread within the plants through the xylem.

Once within the plant, the bacteria need to be able to scavenge iron from the two main iron-transporting ligands, nicotianamine and citrate. To do this they produce siderophores, thus the enterobacterial Erwinia chrysanthemi produces two siderophores, chrysobactin and achromobactin. Xanthomonas group of plant pathogens produce xanthoferrin siderophores to scavenge the iron.

Like in humans, plants also possess siderophore binding proteins involved in host defense, like the major birch pollen allergen, Bet v 1, which are usually secreted and possess a lipocalin-like structure.

=== Animal pathogens ===
Pathogenic bacteria and fungi have developed the means of survival in animal tissue. They may invade the gastro-intestinal tract (Escherichia, Shigella and Salmonella), the lung (Pseudomonas, Bordetella, Streptococcus and Corynebacterium), skin (Staphylococcus) or the urinary tract (Escherichia and Pseudomonas). Such bacteria may colonise wounds (Vibrio and Staphylococcus) and be responsible for septicaemia (Yersinia and Bacillus). Some bacteria survive for long periods of time in intracellular organelles, for instance Mycobacterium. (see table). Because of this continual risk of bacterial and fungal invasion, animals have developed a number of lines of defence based on immunological strategies, the complement system, the production of iron–siderophore binding proteins and the general "withdrawal" of iron.

Infection type	Organism	Siderophore
Dysentery	Shigella sp.	Aerobactin
Intestinal infections	Escherichia coli	Enterobactin
Typhoid	Salmonella sp.	Salmochelin
Plague	Yersinia sp.	Yersiniabactin
Cholera	Vibrio sp.	Vibriobactin
Pulmonary infections	Pseudomonas sp.	Pyoverdins
Whooping cough	Bordetella sp.	Alcaligin
Tuberculosis	Mycobacterium tuberculosis	Mycobactins
Skin and mucous membrane infections	Staphylococcus sp.	Staphyloferrin A
Anthrax	Bacillus anthracis	Petrobactin

There are two major types of iron-binding proteins present in most animals that provide protection against microbial invasion – extracellular protection is achieved by the transferrin family of proteins and intracellular protection is achieved by ferritin. Transferrin is present in the serum at approximately 30 μM, and contains two iron-binding sites, each with an extremely high affinity for iron. Under normal conditions it is about 25–40% saturated, which means that any freely available iron in the serum will be immediately scavenged – thus preventing microbial growth. Most siderophores are unable to remove iron from transferrin. Mammals also produce lactoferrin, which is similar to serum transferrin but possesses an even higher affinity for iron. Lactoferrin is present in secretory fluids, such as sweat, tears and milk, thereby minimising bacterial infection.

Ferritin is present in the cytoplasm of cells and limits the intracellular iron level to approximately 1 μM. Ferritin is a much larger protein than transferrin and is capable of binding several thousand iron atoms in a nontoxic form. Siderophores are unable to directly mobilise iron from ferritin.

In addition to these two classes of iron-binding proteins, a hormone, hepcidin, is involved in controlling the release of iron from absorptive enterocytes, iron-storing hepatocytes and macrophages. Infection leads to inflammation and the release of interleukin-6 (IL-6 ) which stimulates hepcidin expression. In humans, IL-6 production results in low serum iron, making it difficult for invading pathogens to infect. Such iron depletion has been demonstrated to limit bacterial growth in both extracellular and intracellular locations.

In addition to "iron withdrawal" tactics, mammals produce an iron –siderophore binding protein, siderochelin. Siderochelin is a member of the lipocalin family of proteins, which while diverse in sequence, displays a highly conserved structural fold, an 8-stranded antiparallel β-barrel that forms a binding site with several adjacent β-strands. Siderocalin (lipocalin 2) has 3 positively charged residues also located in the hydrophobic pocket, and these create a high affinity binding site for iron(III)–enterobactin. Siderocalin is a potent bacteriostatic agent against E. coli. As a result of infection it is secreted by both macrophages and hepatocytes, enterobactin being scavenged from the extracellular space.

== Medical applications ==
Siderophores have applications in medicine for iron and aluminum overload therapy and antibiotics for improved targeting. Understanding the mechanistic pathways of siderophores has led to opportunities for designing small-molecule inhibitors that block siderophore biosynthesis and therefore bacterial growth and virulence in iron-limiting environments.

Siderophores are useful as drugs in facilitating iron mobilization in humans, especially in the treatment of iron diseases, due to their high affinity for iron. One potentially powerful application is to use the iron transport abilities of siderophores to carry drugs into cells by preparation of conjugates between siderophores and antimicrobial agents. Because microbes recognize and utilize only certain siderophores, such conjugates are anticipated to have selective antimicrobial activity. An example is the cephalosporin antibiotic cefiderocol.

Microbial iron transport (siderophore)-mediated drug delivery makes use of the recognition of siderophores as iron delivery agents in order to have the microbe assimilate siderophore conjugates with attached drugs. These drugs are lethal to the microbe and cause the microbe to apoptosise when it assimilates the siderophore conjugate. Through the addition of the iron-binding functional groups of siderophores into antibiotics, their potency has been greatly increased. This is due to the siderophore-mediated iron uptake system of the bacteria.

== Agricultural applications ==
Poaceae (grasses) including agriculturally important species such as barley and wheat are able to efficiently sequester iron by releasing phytosiderophores via their root into the surrounding soil rhizosphere. Chemical compounds produced by microorganisms in the rhizosphere can also increase the availability and uptake of iron. Plants such as oats are able to assimilate iron via these microbial siderophores. It has been demonstrated that plants are able to use the hydroxamate-type siderophores ferrichrome, rhodotorulic acid and ferrioxamine B; the catechol-type siderophores, agrobactin; and the mixed ligand catechol-hydroxamate-hydroxy acid siderophores biosynthesized by saprophytic root-colonizing bacteria. All of these compounds are produced by rhizospheric bacterial strains, which have simple nutritional requirements, and are found in nature in soils, foliage, fresh water, sediments, and seawater.

Fluorescent pseudomonads have been recognized as biocontrol agents against certain soil-borne plant pathogens. They produce yellow-green pigments (pyoverdines) which fluoresce under UV light and function as siderophores. They deprive pathogens of the iron required for their growth and pathogenesis.

== Other metal ions chelated ==
Siderophores, natural or synthetic, can chelate metal ions other than iron ions. Examples include aluminium, gallium, chromium, copper, zinc, lead, manganese, cadmium, vanadium, zirconium, indium, plutonium, berkelium, californium, and uranium.

== Related processes ==
Alternative means of assimilating iron are surface reduction, lowering of pH, utilization of heme, or extraction of protein-complexed metal. Recent data suggest that iron-chelating molecules with similar properties to siderophores, were produced by marine bacteria under phosphate limiting growth condition. In nature phosphate binds to different type of iron minerals, and therefore it was hypothesized that bacteria can use siderophore-like molecules to dissolve such complex in order to access the phosphate.

== See also ==
- Ionophore
- Oxalic acid
