= C9H11NO =

The molecular formula C_{9}H_{11}NO (molar mass: 149.19 g/mol, exact mass: 149.0841 u) may refer to:

- 2-Nitroso-1-phenylpropane
- 3,4-Dihydro-3-amino-2H-1-benzopyran
- 4'-Aminopropiophenone
- Cathinone
- para-Dimethylaminobenzaldehyde
- β-Keto-N-methylphenethylamine
