= Cetrimide agar =

Selective culture medium

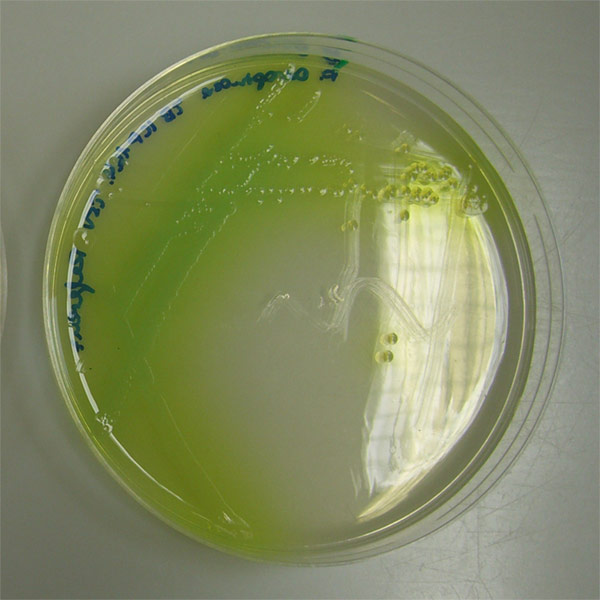
P. aeruginosa with yellow-green pycocyanin-pigment on cetrimid agar-agar

Cetrimide agar is a type of agar used for the selective isolation of the gram-negative bacterium, Pseudomonas aeruginosa. As the name suggests, it contains cetrimide, which is the selective agent against alternate microbial flora. Cetrimide also enhances the production of Pseudomonas pigments such as pyocyanin and pyoverdine, which show a characteristic blue-green and yellow-green colour, respectively.

Cetrimide agar is widely used in the examination of cosmetics, pharmaceuticals and clinical specimens to test for the presence of Pseudomonas aeruginosa.
