= Hot tub folliculitis =

- Other names: Pseudomonas aeruginosa folliculitis
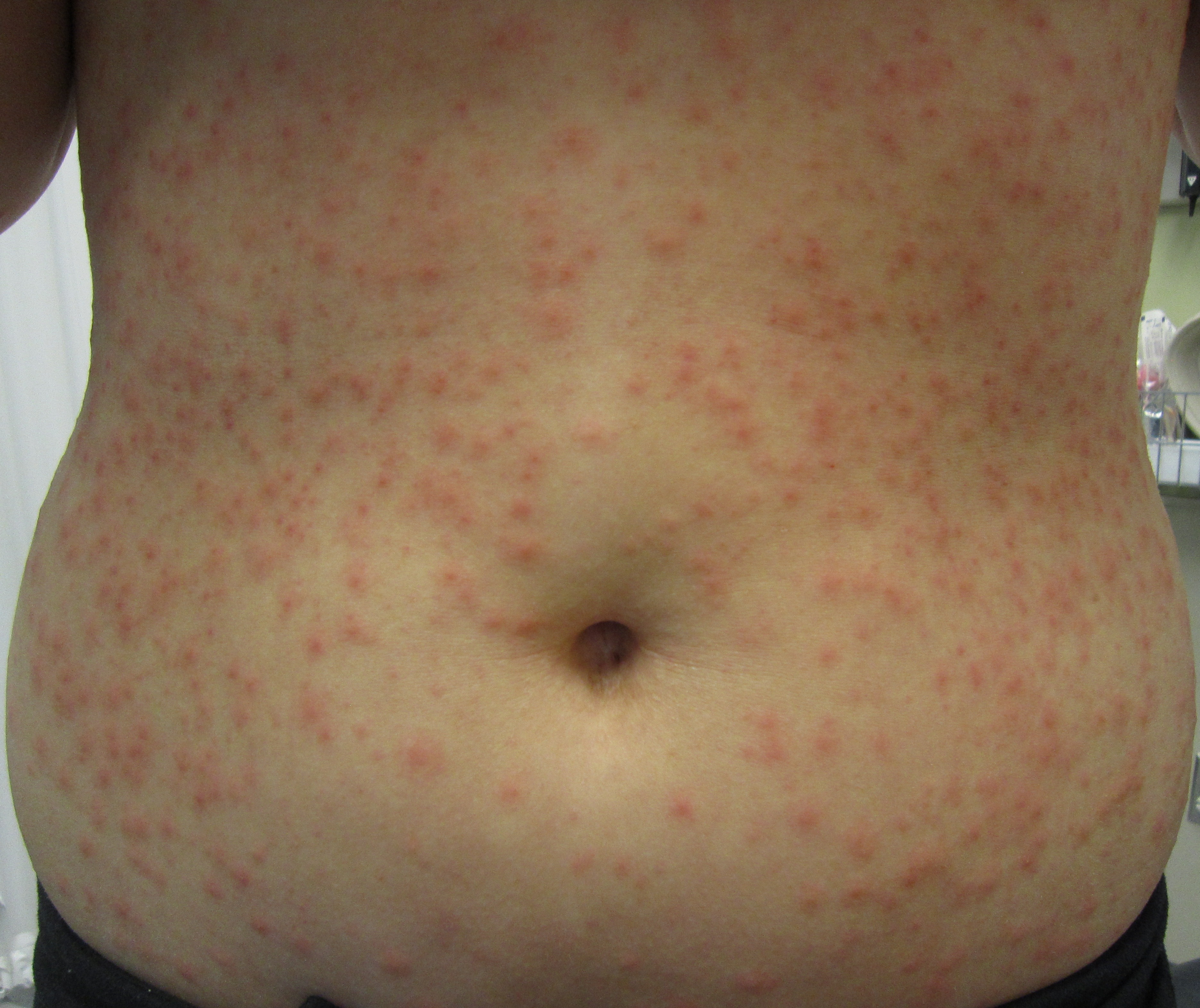
- Pseudomonas folliculitis, also known as hot tub folliculitis
- Specialty: Dermatology
- Symptoms: Rash, with variable amounts of itching and pain
- Usual onset: 24-72 hours after exposure
- Duration: 1-2 weeks
- Causes: Exposure to contaminated water source
- Diagnostic method: Based on symptoms combined with patient history of swimming
- Treatment: Antibiotics

Hot tub folliculitis, also called Pseudomonal folliculitis or Pseudomonas aeruginosa folliculitis, is a common type of folliculitis featuring inflammation of hair follicles and surrounding skin.

This condition is caused by an infection of the skin and hair follicles by the bacterium Pseudomonas aeruginosa. The bacterium is commonly found in poorly maintained recreational water sources such as hot tubs, water slides, and swimming pools. Hot tub folliculitis appears on the skin in the form of a rash, roughly resembling chicken pox and then develops further to appear as a pimple. Children are the most likely to be affected. Hot tub folliculitis can be, but is not always, painful or itchy.

In most cases, the rashes resolve after about 7 to 10 days, only leaving a hyperpigmented lesion that goes away after a few months. Oral antibiotics such as ciprofloxacin may be used to shorten the duration of symptoms.

== Cause ==
This condition typically occurs after exposure to contaminated water, such as in hot tubs, whirlpools, or swimming pools. Pseudomonas aeruginosa is a waterborne bacterium that thrives in warm, moist environments.

The bacterium is known to penetrate the skin through either the natural openings in hair follicles or through small breaks in the skin. The rash and symptoms known as folliculitis in this case apply to the skin eruptions that occur following immune response to the infected areas.

== Diagnosis ==
Clinical suspicion of P. aeruginosa folliculitis usually begins with a combination of the rash's appearance and a history of swimming or hot tub use 24-72 hours before the onset of symptoms. The most common locations for the rash include the upper thorax, the axillary folds, the hips and buttocks, and the areolas. Areas covered by bathing suits are more likely to become infected. The head is usually not affected.

== Treatment ==
Most people do not require treatment and will see the rash resolve on its own within 1-2 weeks. However, those who are immunocompromised are at increased risk, and should always receive treatment with antibiotics. Pseudomonas aeruginosa presents additional challenges when antibiotics are used, because many strains of the organism are resistant to a wide range of medications. The most commonly used antibiotics for hot tub folliculitis are ciprofloxacin and/or gentamicin.

== See also ==
- Skin lesion
- Pseudomonas hot-foot syndrome
