= Pyodermatitis vegetans =

Pyodermatitis vegetans can refer to:

- Pyostomatitis vegetans
- Blastomycosis-like pyoderma
