= Pseudomonas hot-foot syndrome =

- Specialty: Dermatology

Pseudomonas hot-foot syndrome is a self-limited cutaneous condition that occurs on the plantar surface of children after swimming in pool water that has high concentrations of Pseudomonas aeruginosa. The condition typically presents as plantar purple-red nodules.

== See also ==
- Pseudomonal pyoderma
- List of cutaneous conditions
