= RcsR1 small RNA =

RcsR1 sRNA
- Predicted secondary structure and sequence conservation of RcsR1 small RNA

Identifiers
- Rfam: RF02552

Other data
- Domain(s): Bacteria
- GO: GO:0040033,SO:0032055
- SO: SO:0000370
- PDB structures: PDBe

RcsR1 (rhizobial cold and salinity stress riboregulator 1) trans-acting sRNA, formerly known as SmelC587, is a stress-related riboregulator, conserved in Sinorhizobium, Rhizobium and Agrobacterium. It contains highly conserved stem-loops involved in the interaction with several target mRNAs (PhoR, MotE, anti-σE1, GntR, FgA, TrpC). In Sinorhizobium meliloti RcsR1 less conserved central region is responsible for the species-specific interaction with the 5’UTR of autoinducer synthase encoding mRNA sinI. The interaction negatively influences sinI translation.

== See also ==
- SuhB
- EcpR1 sRNA
