= YbhL leader =

ybhL leader
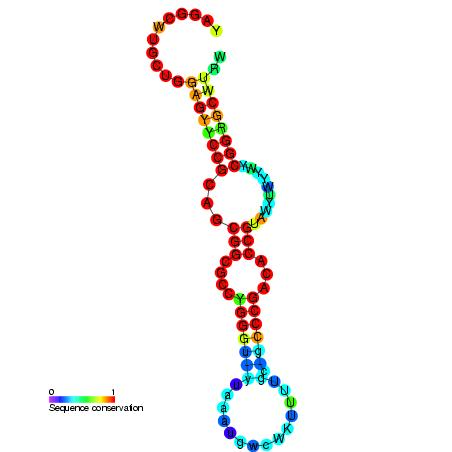
- Predicted secondary structure and sequence conservation of ybhL

Identifiers
- Symbol: ybhL
- Rfam: RF00520

Other data
- RNA type: Cis-reg; leader
- Domain(s): Bacteria
- SO: SO:0005836
- PDB structures: PDBe

The YbhL leader is a putative structured RNA element that is found upstream of the uncharacterized YbhL membrane protein in alpha-proteobacteria.

Other non-coding RNAs uncovered in the same analysis include: speF, suhB, metA and serC.
