= Pseudomonal pyoderma =

- Specialty: Dermatology

Pseudomonal pyoderma is a cutaneous condition, a superficial infection of the skin with P. aeruginosa. The skin can have a 'mousy' odor. It presents typically on the feet with macerated 'moth-eaten' appearance, green-blue purulence, and eroded borders.

== See also ==
- Blastomycosis-like pyoderma
- List of cutaneous conditions
