= EcpR1 sRNA =

EcpR1 (elongated cell phenotype RNA1) is a trans-encoded small non-coding RNA in the plant-symbiotic Sinorhizobium meliloti, previously named SmelC291, SmrC10, or Sra33. According to its overproduction phenotype it was renamed Elongated Cell Phenotype RNA1. Induced by stress, EcpR1 negatively regulates cell cycle master regulatory genes dnaA and gcrA at post-transcriptional level by base pairing between its strongly conserved GC-rich loop and the target mRNAs. It is suggested that EcpR1 connects stress adaptation and cell cycle progression.

== See also ==
- SuhB
- RcsR1 small RNA
