= SpeF leader =

Cis-acting element

speF leader
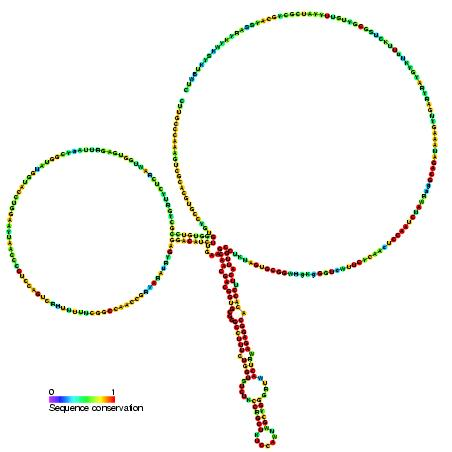
- Predicted secondary structure and sequence conservation of speF

Identifiers
- Symbol: speF
- Rfam: RF00518

Other data
- RNA type: Cis-reg; leader
- Domain(s): Bacteria
- SO: SO:0005836
- PDB structures: PDBe

SpeF is a putative cis-acting element identified in several gram negative alpha proteobacteria. It is proposed to be involved in regulating expression of genes involved in polyamide biosynthesis.

SpeF is one of five putative regulatory elements identified by a computational screen of Agrobacterium tumefaciens and other alpha-proteobacterial genomes for conserved sequence motifs in operon leaders. In the majority of species analysed it is located in the leader of an operon containing the speF gene an ornithine decarboxylase enzyme that catalyses one of the first steps in polyamine biosynthesis. However, the authors did not detect binding of metabolites related to this pathway (L-ornithine, L-lysine, meso-diaminopimelate, putrescine, cadaverine, or spermidine) to the SpeF leader.

Other non-coding RNAs uncovered in the same analysis include: suhB, ybhL, metA and serC.
