= Pyocyanin =

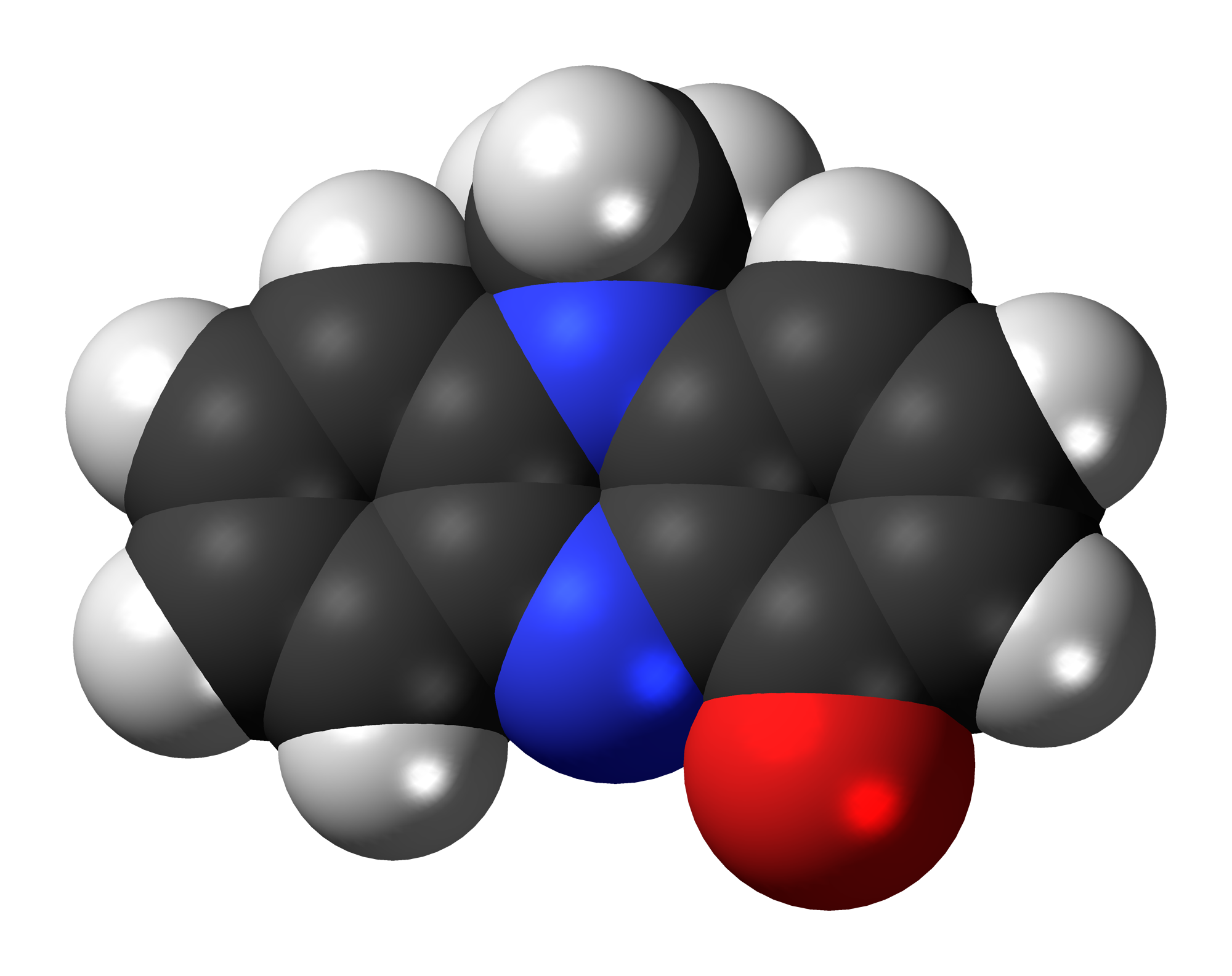

Names
- Preferred IUPAC name 5-Methylphenazin-1(5H)-one
- Other names Pyocyanin; Pyrocyanine; 5-Methyl-1(5H)-phenazinone; Sanasin; Sanazin

Identifiers
CAS Number	85-66-5
3D model (JSmol)	Interactive image
ChEBI	CHEBI:8653
ChEMBL	ChEMBL2289232
ChemSpider	6558
ECHA InfoCard	100.213.248
EC Number	687-347-7
KEGG	C01748
MeSH	D011710
PubChem CID	6817
UNII	9OQM399341
CompTox Dashboard (EPA)	DTXSID9041108
- InChI: InChI=1S/C13H10N2O/c1-15-10-6-3-2-5-9(10)14-13-11(15)7-4-8-12(13)16/h2-8H,1H3 Key: YNCMLFHHXWETLD-UHFFFAOYSA-N; InChI=1/C13H10N2O/c1-15-10-6-3-2-5-9(10)14-13-11(15)7-4-8-12(13)16/h2-8H,1H3 Key: YNCMLFHHXWETLD-UHFFFAOYAI
- SMILES: CN1C2=CC=CC=C2N=C3C1=CC=CC3=O

Properties
Chemical formula	C_{13}H_{10}N_{2}O
Molar mass	210.236 g·mol^{−1}
Appearance	Solid

Hazards
- GHS labelling
Pictograms	(GHS05: Corrosive) (GHS07: Exclamation mark)
Signal word	Danger
Hazard statements	H302, H318
Precautionary statements	P264, P270, P280, P301+P312, P305+P351+P338, P310, P330, P501
- Except where otherwise noted, data are given for materials in their standard state (at 25 °C [77 °F], 100 kPa). verify (what is ?) Infobox references

Pyocyanin (PCN^{−}) is one of the many toxic compounds produced and secreted by the Gram negative bacterium Pseudomonas aeruginosa. Pyocyanin is a blue secondary metabolite, turning red below pH 4.9, with the ability to oxidise and reduce other molecules and therefore kill microbes competing against P. aeruginosa as well as mammalian cells of the lungs which P. aeruginosa has infected during cystic fibrosis. Since pyocyanin is a zwitterion at blood pH, it is easily able to cross the cell membrane. There are three different states in which pyocyanin can exist: oxidized (blue), monovalently reduced (colourless) or divalently reduced (red). Mitochondria play an important role in the cycling of pyocyanin between its redox states. Due to its redox-active properties, pyocyanin generates reactive oxygen species.

== Biosynthesis ==
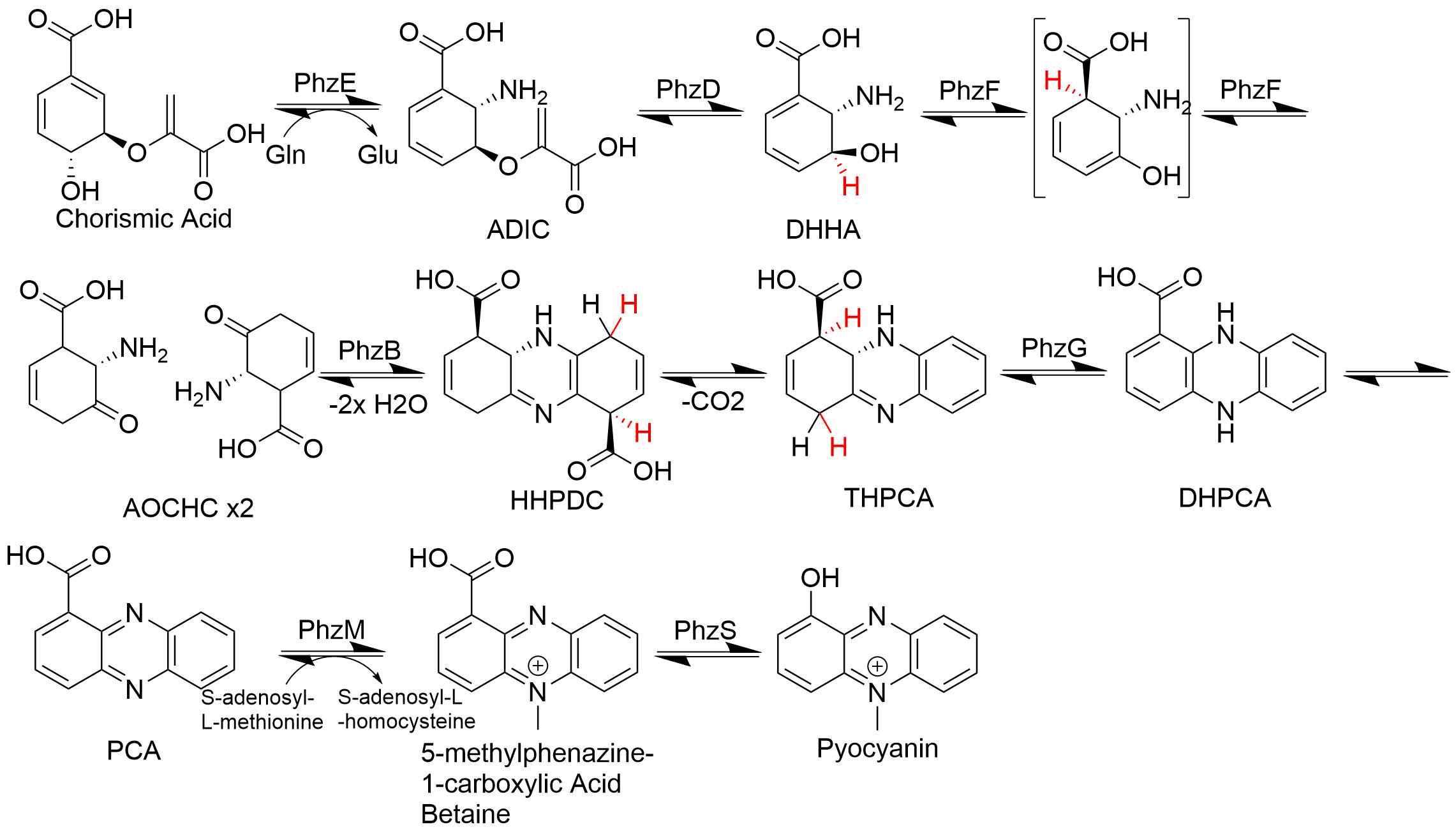
Biosynthesis of pyocyanin from Pseudomonas aeruginosa. Hydrogens abstracted during next enzymatic step colored red.

Pyocyanin biosynthesis begins with the synthesis of the phenazine-1-carboxylic acid (PCA) core. In this reaction the enzyme PhzE catalyzes the loss of the hydroxyl group from C4 of chorismic acid as well as the transfer of an amine group from glutamine to form glutamic acid and 2-amino-2-desoxyisochorismic acid (ADIC). Following this, PhzD catalyzes the hydrolytic removal the pyruvate moiety from ADIC to form (5S,6S)-6-amino-5-hydroxy-1,3-cyclohexadieve-1-carboxylic acid (DHHA). In the next step, PhzF catalyzes two steps: the abstraction of a hydrogen from C3 of DHHA, delocalization of the double bond system and reprotonation at C1 as well as enol tautomerization to form the highly unstable 6-amino-5-oxocyclohex-2-ene-1-carboxylic acid (AOCHC). From here two molecules of AOCHC are condensed by PhzB to form the tricyclic compound, hexahydrophenazine-1,6-dicarboxylic acid (HHPDC). The product of this reaction, HHPDC, is unstable and spontaneously undergoes oxidative decarboxylation in an uncatalyzed reaction to form tetrahydrophenazine-1,6-carboxylic acid (THPCA). In the final step of phenazine-1-carboxylic acid synthesis the enzyme PhzG catalyzes the oxidation of THPCA to dihydro-phenazine-1-carboxylic acid. This is the last catalyzed step in the production of PCA, the last step is an uncatalyzed oxidation of DHPCA to PCA. The conversion of PCA to pyocyanin is achieved in two enzymatic steps: firstly, PCA is methylated on N5 to 5-methylphenazine-1-carboxylate betaine by the enzyme PhzM using the cofactor S-adenosyl-L-methionine and secondly, PhzS catalyzes the hydroxylative decarboxylation of this substrate to form the final product, pyocyanin.

The chromosomes of most P. aeruginosa strains carry two nearly identical operons, phzA1B1C1D1E1F1G1 and phzA2B2C2D2E2F2G2, which encode the enzymes required to produce PCA. Transcription of these operons is controlled by quorum sensing, and more specifically by the Pseudomonas Quinolone Signal (PQS) system involving the transcriptional regulator MvfR (also known as PqsR). Conversion of PCA into pyocyanin is then achieved by the products of phzS and phzS, which are unique genes in the chromosome. Biosynthesis can be impaired by disrupting the aro pathway which is needed for the synthesis of chorismic acid from shikimate.

== Redox warfare ==
Pyocyanin inactivates catalase by reducing its gene’s transcription as well as directly targeting the enzyme itself. Glutathione is an important antioxidant modulated by pyocyanin. In particular the pool of the reduced form is depleted while the oxidised form is promoted by hydrogen peroxide which is not dismutated by catalase. In the cystic fibrosis lung, intracellular pyocyanin converts molecular oxygen to the superoxide free radical by oxidizing NADPH to NADP^{+}. This has a doubly negative effect on the lungs. Firstly, the NADPH used by pyocyanin depletes the available substrate for the reaction catalysed by the NADPH oxidase enzyme. Secondly, the superoxide radical generated can inhibit cytokines, such as IL-4, IL-13 and IFN-γ, which usually upregulate NADPH oxidase. When the lung is confronted with pyocyanin, an increased concentration of catalase and superoxide dismutase is seen in order to deal with the barrage of radicals being produced.

== Targets ==
Pyocyanin is able to target a wide range of cellular components and pathways. Pathways that are affected by pyocyanin include the electron transport chain, vesicular transport, and cell growth. An enhanced susceptibility to pyocyanin is seen in cells with certain mutant proteins or complexes. Mutations in genes affecting V-ATPase synthesis and assembly, vesicle transport machinery, and protein sorting machinery all confer an increased sensitivity to pyocyanin which further enhances the effects on cystic fibrosis on the patient. Vacuolar- ATPase in yeast cells is a particularly potent target as it is the main non-mitochondrial producer of ATP but also has numerous other functions such as calcium homeostatic control, the facilitation of receptor-mediated endocytosis and the degradation of proteins. Therefore, the inactivation of vacuolar-ATPase by hydrogen peroxide produced by pyocyanin has huge consequences for the lung. Additional to these effects, another target of pyocyanin is caspase 3-like proteases which can then go on to initiate apoptosis and necrosis. Mitochondrial electron carriers ubiquinone and nicotinic acid are also susceptible to pyocyanin. The cell cycle can be disturbed by the action of pyocyanin, and it can hinder the proliferation of lymphocytes. This is done by the generation of reactive oxygen intermediates, such as hydrogen peroxide and superoxide, which cause oxidative stress by directly damaging DNA or by targeting other constituents of the cell cycle such as DNA recombination and repair machinery. Pyocyanin contributes to the disproportion of protease and antiprotease activity by disabling α_{1}- protease inhibitor.

== Cystic fibrosis ==
Many studies have concluded that pyocyanin has a derogatory effect in cystic fibrosis which enables P. aeruginosa to persist in the cystic fibrosis lung; it is often detected in the sputum of cystic fibrosis patients. Pyocyanin in vitro has the ability to interfere with functions such as ciliary beating and therefore cause epithelial dysfunction as the ciliary are needed to sweep mucus up the throat. Additionally, neutrophil apoptosis, immunoglobulin release from B-lymphocytes, and interleukin release (e.g. IL-8 and CCL5) are all impaired by pyocyanin, weakening the immune system of the lung. In vivo studies have shown that the growth of fungus is inhibited in the presence of pyocyanin. The fungicidal mechanism is the activation of NAD(P)H to induce a redox-active cascade producing reactive oxygen intermediates. This allows P. aeruginosa to have a competitive advantage as it may dominate over other microorganisms in the cystic fibrosis lung. The intracellular concentration of ATP is also diminished by pyocyanin causing further damage to CFTR which are already impaired in cystic fibrosis. CFTR channels rely on ATP for two main purposes. Firstly, the binding and hydrolysis of ATP has to occur at two nucleotide binding domains for the channel to move between its open and closed conformation. Secondly, phosphorylation of CFTR by Protein kinase A should occur in order for the channel to be operational. PKA is activated by cAMP which is produced from ATP. Both these processes are impaired when ATP is depleted by pyocyanin.

== Defence against pyocyanin ==
Caenorhabditis elegans possesses two specific ABC transporters called pgp-1 and pgp-2 which are effectively able to extrude intracellular pyocyanin in an energy dependent manner.

== See also ==
- Pseudomonas aeruginosa
- Pyoverdine
- Cystic fibrosis
