= Ecthyma =

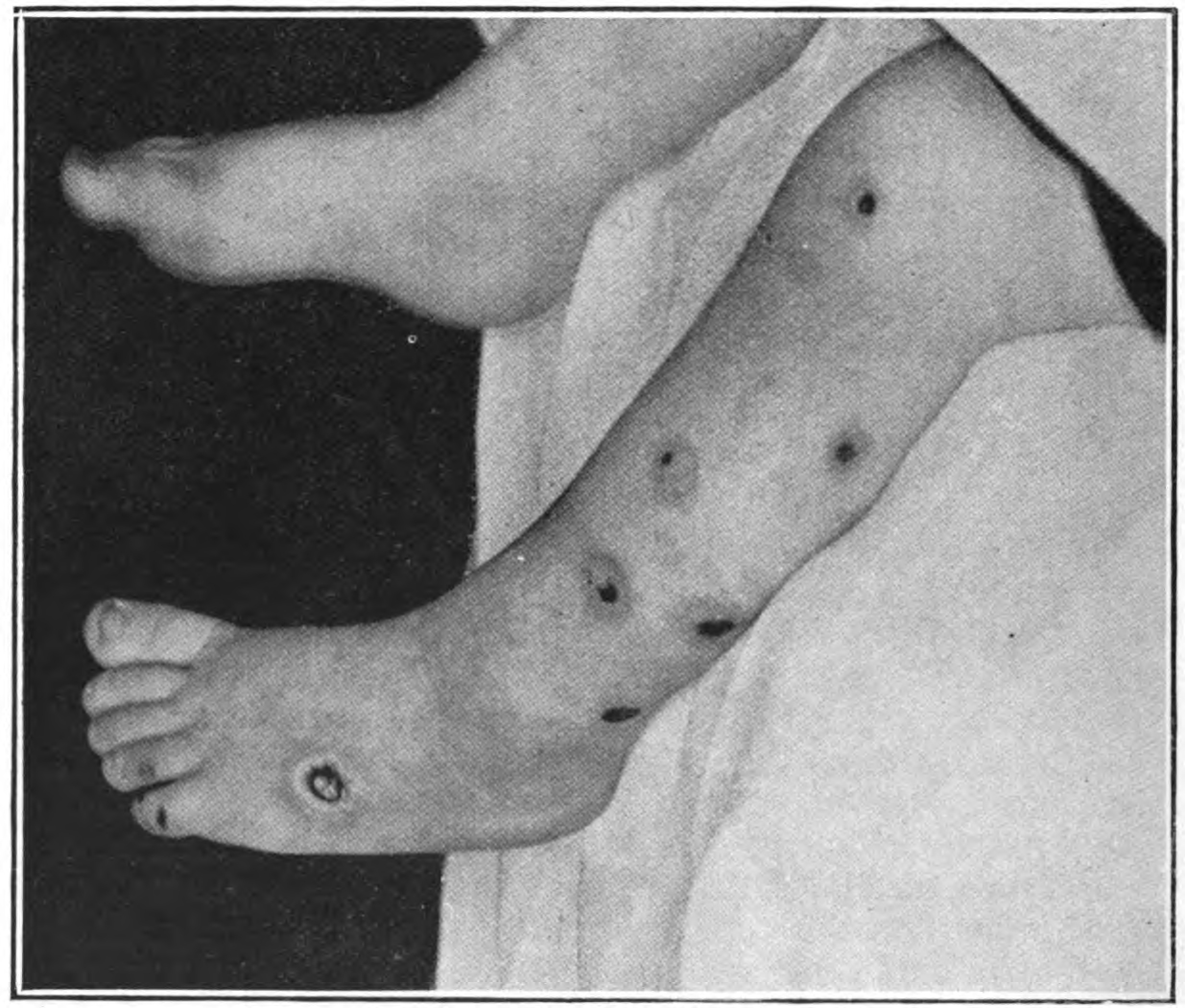
- Ecthyma
- Specialty: Dermatology

Ecthyma (/ɛkˈθaɪmə/) is a variation of impetigo, presenting at a deeper level of tissue.

It is usually associated with group A (beta-hemolytic) Streptococcus (abbreviated GAS). This variation has similar features to those of impetigo.

== See also ==
- Ecthyma gangrenosum
