= Ecthyma gangrenosum =

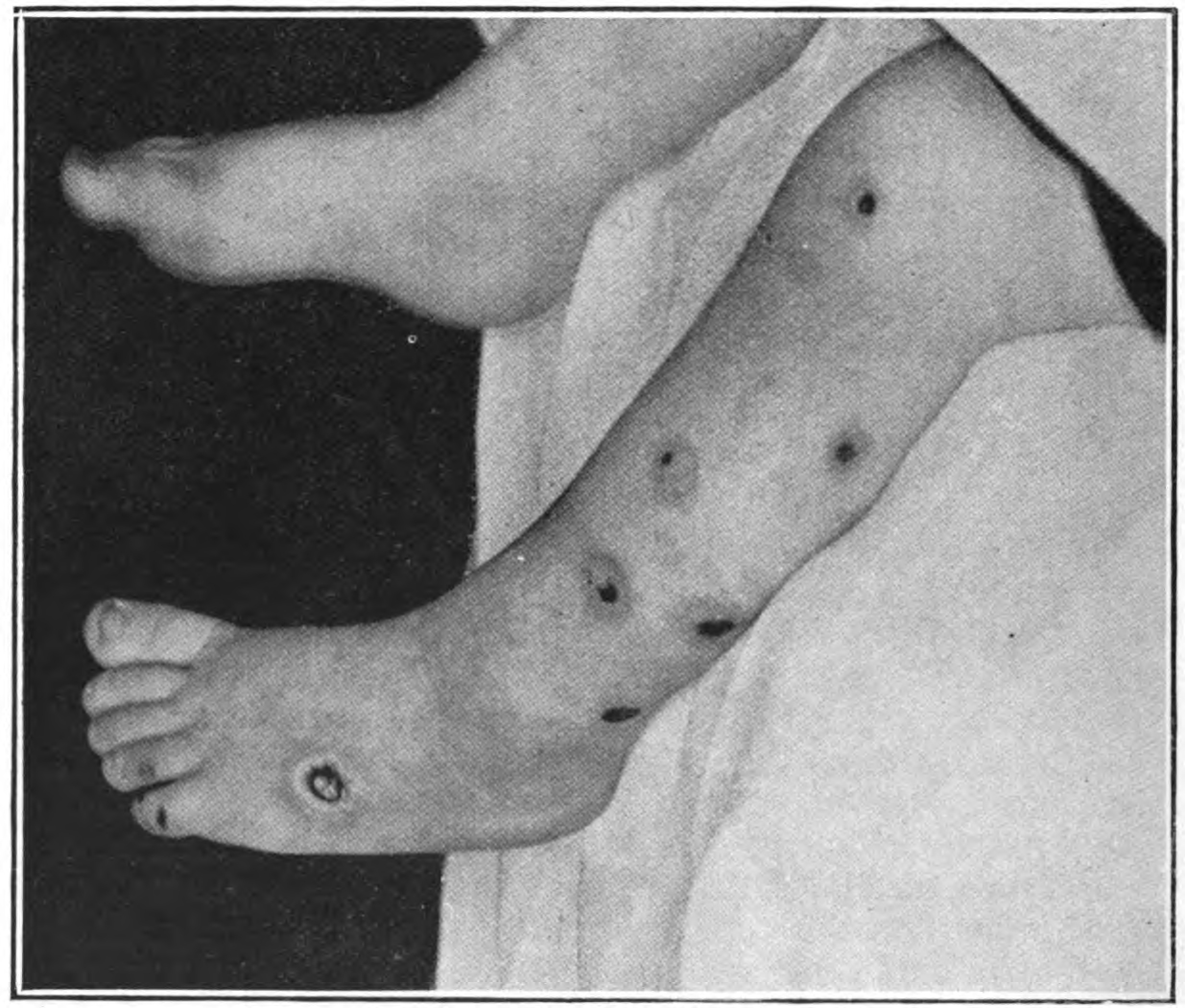
- Specialty: Infectious diseases

Ecthyma gangrenosum is a type of skin lesion characterized by vesicles or blisters, which rapidly evolve into pustules and necrotic ulcers with undermined tender erythematous border. "Ecthyma" means a pus-forming infection of the skin with an ulcer, "gangrenosum" refers to the accompanying gangrene or necrosis. It is classically associated with Pseudomonas aeruginosa bacteremia, but it is not pathognomonic. P. aeruginosa is a Gram-negative, aerobic bacillus.

This type of skin lesion was first described in association with Pseudomonas aeruginosa by L. Barker in 1897. It was given the name "ecthyma gangrenosum" by Hitschmann and Kreibich.

It mostly occurs in patients with underlying immunocompromise (e.g. malignancy, HIV, hematologic disorders). Although most cases are due to P. aeruginosa infection, recent reports of this skin lesion associate it with other microorganisms, such as Escherichia coli, Citrobacter freundii, Klebsiella pneumoniae, various other Pseudomonas species, and Morganella morganii.

== Signs and symptoms ==
The primary skin lesion usually starts with a macule that is painless, round, and erythematous. Then, it develops into a pustule, and then a bulla with a central hemorrhagic focus. The bulla progresses into an ulcer, which extends laterally. Finally, it becomes a gangrenous ulcer with a central black eschar surrounded by an erythematous halo. The lesions may be single or multiple. They are most commonly seen in perineum and underarm pit, but they can occur in any part of the body.

== Mechanism ==
The organism enters directly through the breakdown of mechanical defense barriers such as mucosa or skin. Conditions that lead to the development of an immunocompromised state make the patient more susceptible to ecthyma gangrenosum and sepsis. In case of sepsis, the bacteria reach the skin via the bloodstream. Defective humoral or cellular immunity increases risk, as the organisms are not cleared from the bloodstream as usual. The main mechanism of the organism that is causing the typical skin lesions is the invasion of the organism into the arteries and veins in the dermis and subcutaneous tissues of the skin. This perivascular invasion leads to nodular formation, ulceration, vasculitis, and necrosis due to impaired blood supply. Perivascular involvement is achieved by direct entry of bacteria through the skin or hematogenous spreading in case of sepsis.

== Diagnosis ==
Magnetic resonance imaging can be done in case of ecthyma gangrenosum of plantar foot to differentiate from necrotizing fasciitis.

== Prevention ==
The main organism associated with ecthyma gangrenosum is P. aeruginosa. Multibacterial cases are reported, as well. Prevention measures include practicing proper hygiene, educating the immunocompromised patients for awareness to avoid possible conditions, and seeking timely medical treatment.

== Treatments ==
Treatments involve antibiotics that cover for P. aeruginosa. Antipseudomonal penicillins, aminoglycosides, fluoroquinolones, third-generation cephalosporins, or ceftriaxone aztreonam can be given. Usually, the antibiotics are changed according to the culture and sensitivity results. In patients with very low white blood cell counts, granulocyte-macrophage colony-stimulating factor may be given. Depending on the causal agents, antivirals or antifungals can be added.

Surgery is needed if extensive necrosis is not responding to medical treatments.

== Recent research ==
A recent retrospective study of all cases of ecthyma gangrenosum from 2004 to 2010 in a university hospital in Mexico shows that neutropenia in immunocompromised patients is the most common risk factor for ecthyma gangrenosum.
