= SuhB =

suhB
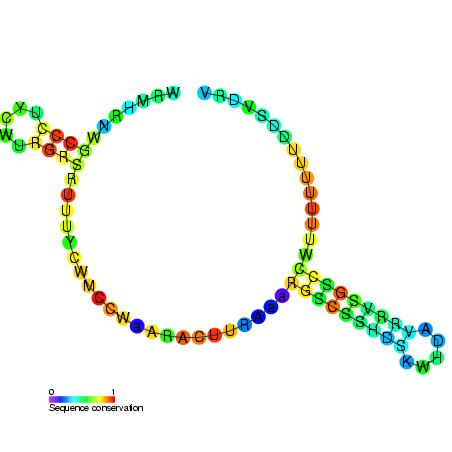
- Predicted secondary structure and sequence conservation of suhB

Identifiers
- Symbol: suhB
- Rfam: RF00519

Other data
- RNA type: Gene; sRNA
- Domain: Bacteria
- GO: GO:0006353 GO:0003715
- SO: SO:0000655
- PDB structures: PDBe

suhB, also known as mmgR (makes more granules regulator), is a non-coding RNA found multiple times in the Agrobacterium tumefaciens genome and related alpha-proteobacteria. Other non-coding RNAs uncovered in the same analysis include speF, ybhL, metA, and serC.

Several studies in Sinorhizobium meliloti showed that the suhB element is indeed a non-coding RNA. It was first detected by Northern blot and called Sm8RNA, then in an RNAseq study and referred to as SmelC689.

The mutant (lacking the small RNA) phenotype's cytoplasm contains a higher content of polyhydroxybutyrate (PHB) storage granules than the wild type strain. The sRNA is required to regulate the intracellular accumulation of PHB in Sinorhizobium meliloti.

Northern blot confirmed the expression of the sRNA in other rhizobia species. suhB homologues were found in most alpha-proteobacteria. The Rho-independent terminator and a single-stranded region 10-mer (UUUCCUCCCU) are completely conserved. Hence, it was proposed to define a new family of alpha-proteobacterial sRNA, alpha-r8, of which suhB is a member.

RNA binding protein Hfq binds and stabilises suhB. Expression of the mmgR gene was shown to be controlled by nitrogen (N). Further study has shown that the regulatory proteins NtrC may be required for expression of the suhB gene upon N limitation. Under carbon (C) limitation, suhB transcription is repressed by AntiA.

suhB is also present in Sphingopyxis granuli strain TFA, an alpha-proteobacterium that uses the solvent tetralin as an energy source. suhB has been detected as a 61 nt long sRNA by Northern blot in TFA cells growing at high rates. β-galactosidase activity of a PsuhB::lacZ fusion confirmed the lower expression of suhB in TFA cells growing at low rates. A mutant lacking suhB expresses the thn genes (tetralin degradation) even in the presence of a preferential carbon source (catabolite repression conditions). This phenotype is due to the release of the negative effect of suhB on ThnR translation. Hfq is also involved in the interaction between suhB and the 5′ UTR thnR mRNA, which results in thn gene repression in catabolite repression conditions.

== See also ==
- EcpR1 sRNA
- RcsR1 small RNA
