= Aminoglycoside N6'-acetyltransferase =

aminoglycoside N6'-acetyltransferase

Identifiers
- EC no.: 2.3.1.82
- CAS no.: 56467-65-3

Databases
- IntEnz: IntEnz view
- BRENDA: BRENDA entry
- ExPASy: NiceZyme view
- KEGG: KEGG entry
- MetaCyc: metabolic pathway
- PRIAM: profile
- PDB structures: RCSB PDB PDBe PDBsum
- Gene Ontology: AmiGO / QuickGO
Search
- PMC: articles
- PubMed: articles
- NCBI: proteins

In enzymology, an aminoglycoside N6'-acetyltransferase (EC 2.3.1.82) is an enzyme that catalyzes the chemical reaction

acetyl-CoA + kanamycin-B $\rightleftharpoons$ CoA + N_{6}'-acetylkanamycin-B

Thus, the two substrates of this enzyme are acetyl-CoA and kanamycin B, whereas its two products are CoA and N6'-acetylkanamycin-B.

This enzyme belongs to the family of transferases, specifically those acyltransferases transferring groups other than aminoacyl groups. The systematic name of this enzyme class is acetyl-CoA:kanamycin-B N6'-acetyltransferase. Other names in common use include aminoglycoside 6'-N-acetyltransferase, aminoglycoside-6'-acetyltransferase, aminoglycoside-6-N-acetyltransferase, and kanamycin acetyltransferase.

== Structural studies ==
As of late 2007, 4 structures have been solved for this class of enzymes, with PDB accession codes 1S3Z, 1S5K, 1S60, and 2A4N.
