= Pseudomon-1 RNA motif =

Pseudomon-1 RNA
- Consensus secondary structure of Pseudomon-1 RNAs

Identifiers
- Symbol: Pseudomon-1
- Rfam: RF01719

Other data
- RNA type: sRNA
- Domain: Pseudomonas
- PDB structures: PDBe

The Pseudomon-1 RNA motif is a conserved RNA identified by bioinformatics. It is used by most species whose genomes have been sequenced and that are classified within the genus Pseudomonas, and is also present in Azotobacter vinelandii, a closely related species. It is presumed to function as a non-coding RNA. Pseudomon-1 RNAs consistently have a downstream rho-independent transcription terminator.

The intergenic region containing Pseudomon-1 RNAs were also detected later by an independent study based on deep sequencing and called SPA0122 The genes surrounding this region suggest a similarity to Spot 42 RNA, but the Pseudomonas RNA functions to regulate the AlgC enzyme Based on this information, the new name ErsA for the RNA was adopted. Negatively regulates major porin oprD expression responsible for uptake of carbapenem antibiotics, by base pairing with oprD 5′UTR (leading to increased bacterial resistance to meropenem). ErsA positively regulates amrZ mRNA and contributes to biofilm formation and motility.
