= 2-Nitroso-1-phenylpropane =

Names
- Systematic IUPAC name 2-nitrosopropylbenzene

Identifiers
CAS Number	55941-34-9
3D model (JSmol)	Interactive image
ChemSpider	110742
PubChem CID	124315
CompTox Dashboard (EPA)	DTXSID90971356
- InChI: InChI=1S/C9H11NO/c1-8(10-11)7-9-5-3-2-4-6-9/h2-6,8H,7H2,1H3 Key: JNWJQOCPCZKSQI-UHFFFAOYSA-N
- SMILES: CC(CC1=CC=CC=C1)N=O

Properties
Chemical formula	C_{9}H_{11}NO
Molar mass	149.193 g·mol^{−1}
- Except where otherwise noted, data are given for materials in their standard state (at 25 °C [77 °F], 100 kPa). Infobox references

2-Nitroso-1-phenylpropane, also known as N-nitrosoamphetamine, is a product of the oxidation of N-hydroxyamphetamine, which is formed during the metabolism of amphetamine and methamphetamine and plays a role in their potential toxicity.

== Toxicology ==
=== Toxicodynamics ===
N-Nitrosoamphetamine is capable of binding strongly to the heme sites of various proteins (such as microperoxidase 8, prostaglandin H synthase, nitric oxide synthase, as well as hemoglobin and myoglobin). By interacting with the divalent iron of heme, it forms stable nitrosoenzyme derivatives of the form Fe^{II}-N(O)amphetamine. Such derivatives inhibit the normal function of these proteins.

=== Toxicokinetics ===
The compound is oxidized (specifically, the beta-carbon is oxidized to nitrogen), forming what is known as a “beta-hydroxylated nitrosodimer.” Nitroso compounds, ketones, and alcohols are also formed during this process. However, the formation of ketones and alcohols depends on the presence of cofactors (special auxiliary molecules necessary for enzyme activity). Under these conditions, N-nitrosoamphetamine was not reduced back; that is, the reaction proceeded toward oxidation and structural modification rather than reduction.
