= Β-Keto-N-methylphenethylamine =

β-Keto-N-methylphenethylamine

Clinical data
- Other names: βk-NMPEA; FTS-096; FTS096; Methylaminoacetophenone; 2-(Methylamino)acetophenone; NM-AcP; MAA
- Drug class: Norepinephrine–dopamine releasing agent

Identifiers
- IUPAC name: 2-(methylamino)-1-phenylethanone
- CAS Number: 35534-19-1
- PubChem CID: 416157
- ChemSpider: 368424
- ChEMBL: ChEMBL1907015
- CompTox Dashboard (EPA): DTXSID70328985

Chemical and physical data
- Formula: C_{9}H_{11}NO
- Molar mass: 149.193 g·mol^{−1}
- 3D model (JSmol): Interactive image
- SMILES: CNCC(=O)C1=CC=CC=C1
- InChI: InChI=1S/C9H11NO/c1-10-7-9(11)8-5-3-2-4-6-8/h2-6,10H,7H2,1H3; Key:VVFCJVLORNFVHI-UHFFFAOYSA-N

β-Keto-N-methylphenethylamine (βk-NMPEA), also known as FTS-096, is a monoamine releasing agent of the phenethylamine family. It is the N-methyl analogue of phenacylamine (β-ketophenethylamine or α-desmethylcathinone) and the β-keto analogue of N-methylphenethylamine. The drug acts as a norepinephrine–dopamine releasing agent (NDRA), with EC_{50} values for induction of monoamine release of 148 nM for norepinephrine, 1,860 nM for dopamine, and >60,000 nM for serotonin in rat brain synaptosomes. βk-NMPEA was first described in the scientific literature by 2019.

== See also ==
- Phenylethanolamine (β-hydroxyphenethylamine)
- β-Methylphenethylamine
- Phenpromethamine (N,β-dimethylphenethylamine)
