= 2-Aminoacetophenone =

Phenethylamine derivative

Clinical data
- Other names: Phenylacylamine; β-Ketophenethylamine; β-Ketophenylethylamine; β-Oxophenethylamine; β-Oxophenylethylamine; β-Keto-PEA; β-Oxo-PEA; βk-PEA; bk-PEA; 2-Aminoacetophenone; ortho-Aminoacetophenone; o-Aminoacetophenone; α-Desmethylcathinone; α-Demethylcathinone; PAL-27; PAL27
- Drug class: Norepinephrine–dopamine releasing agent; Stimulant

Identifiers
- IUPAC name: 2-amino-1-phenylethanone
- CAS Number: 613-89-8
- PubChem CID: 11952
- ChemSpider: 11458
- UNII: 4M571C83H7
- ChEBI: CHEBI:104022
- ChEMBL: ChEMBL128079
- CompTox Dashboard (EPA): DTXSID80210206
- ECHA InfoCard: 100.009.418

Chemical and physical data
- Formula: C_{8}H_{9}NO
- Molar mass: 135.166 g·mol^{−1}
- 3D model (JSmol): Interactive image
- SMILES: C1=CC=C(C=C1)C(=O)CN
- InChI: InChI=1S/C8H9NO/c9-6-8(10)7-4-2-1-3-5-7/h1-5H,6,9H2; Key:HEQOJEGTZCTHCF-UHFFFAOYSA-N

2-Aminoacetophenone, also known as β-ketophenethylamine, α-desmethylcathinone, or phenacylamine, is a substituted phenethylamine derivative. It is the phenethylamine homologue of cathinone (β-ketoamphetamine) and hence is a parent compound of a large number of stimulant and entactogen drugs.

Phenacylamine is also active itself; it is a potent monoamine releasing agent of dopamine (EC_{50} = 208 nM) in vitro, whereas it was inactive for serotonin (EC_{50} > 10,000 nM) and the EC_{50} for norepinephrine was not assessed but the drug induced 96% release of norepinephrine at a concentration of 10,000 nM. Hence, phenacylamine acts as a norepinephrine–dopamine releasing agent (NDRA).

Despite its activity in vitro however, phenacylamine failed to substitute for dextroamphetamine in animal drug discrimination tests at doses several-fold higher than effective doses of cathinone. It was concluded that, similarly to phenethylamine but in contrast to amphetamine and cathinone, phenylacylamine is likely to be rapidly inactivated via monoamine oxidase (MAO)-mediated metabolism in vivo and will be inactive without concomitant use of a monoamine oxidase inhibitor (MAOI). It has also been suggested that phenacylamine may have diminished blood–brain barrier permeability and limited central activity due to its decreased lipophilicity relative to cathinone.

== See also ==
- Substituted cathinone
- Phenylethanolamine (β-hydroxyphenethylamine)
- N-Methylphenethylamine
- β-Keto-N-methylphenethylamine
- Acetophenone
