= Acyl-homoserine-lactone synthase =

Class of enzymes

Identifiers
- EC no.: 2.3.1.184
- CAS no.: 176023-66-8

Databases
- IntEnz: IntEnz view
- BRENDA: BRENDA entry
- ExPASy: NiceZyme view
- KEGG: KEGG entry
- MetaCyc: metabolic pathway
- PRIAM: profile
- PDB structures: RCSB PDB PDBe PDBsum
Search
- PMC: articles
- PubMed: articles
- NCBI: proteins

Acyl-homoserine-lactone synthase (EC 2.3.1.184) is an enzyme with systematic name acyl-(acyl-carrier protein):S-adenosyl-L-methionine acyltranserase (lactone-forming, methylthioadenosine-releasing). This enzyme catalyses the following chemical reaction

acyl-[acyl-carrier protein] + S-adenosyl-L-methionine $\rightleftharpoons$ [acyl-carrier protein] + S-methyl-5'-thioadenosine + N-acyl-L-homoserine lactone

Acyl-homoserine lactones (AHLs) are produced by a number of bacterial species and are used by them to regulate the expression of virulence genes in a process known as quorum-sensing.

== Alternate names ==
acyl-homoserine lactone synthase, acyl homoserine lactone synthase, acyl-homoserinelactone synthase, acylhomoserine lactone synthase, AHL synthase, AHS, AHSL synthase, AhyI, AinS, AinS protein, autoinducer synthase, autoinducer synthesis protein rhlI, EsaI, ExpISCC1, ExpISCC3065, LasI, LasR, LuxI, LuxI protein, LuxM, N-acyl homoserine lactone synthase, RhlI, YspI, acyl-[acyl carrier protein]:S-adenosyl-L-methionine acyltranserase (lactone-forming, methylthioadenosine-releasing)
