= Blastomycosis-like pyoderma =

- Other names: Pyoderma vegetans
- Specialty: Dermatology

Blastomycosis-like pyoderma is a cutaneous condition characterized by large verrucous plaques with elevated borders and multiple pustules.

== See also ==
- List of cutaneous conditions
- pyoderma
- blastomycosis
