= Gramicidin B =

Chemical compound

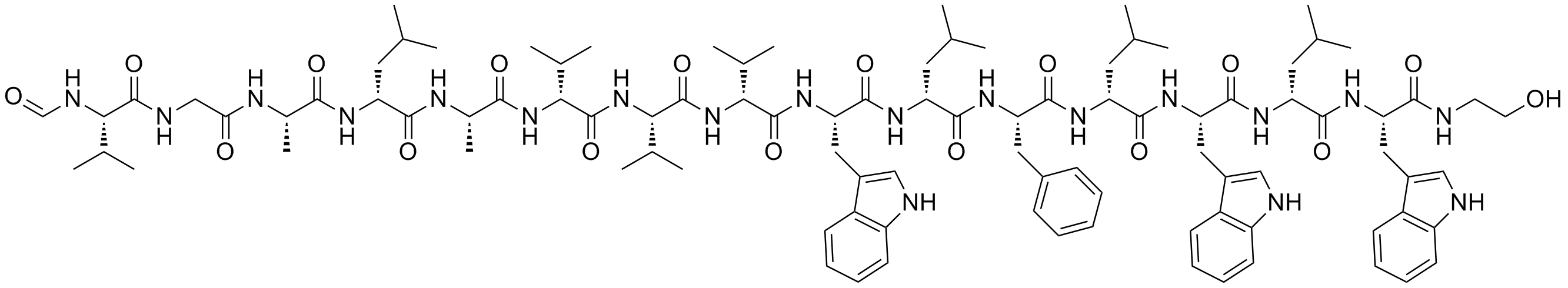

Clinical data
- Other names: formyl-L-Val-Gly-L-Ala-D-Leu-L-Ala-D-Val-L-Val-D-Val-L-Trp-D-Leu-L-Phe-D-Leu-L-Trp-D-Leu-L-Trp-ethanolamine
- Routes of administration: topical

Identifiers
- IUPAC name: Gramicidin B
- CAS Number: 9062-60-6
- PubChem CID: 25244501
- ChemSpider: 26333279
- UNII: 7F82B1QV4X
- ChEBI: CHEBI:188873

Chemical and physical data
- Formula: C_{97}H_{139}N_{19}O_{17}
- Molar mass: 1843.295 g·mol^{−1}
- 3D model (JSmol): Interactive image
- SMILES: C[C@@H](C(=O)N[C@H](CC(C)C)C(=O)N[C@@H](C)C(=O)N[C@H](C(C)C)C(=O)N[C@@H](C(C)C)C(=O)N[C@H](C(C)C)C(=O)N[C@@H](Cc1c[nH]c2c1cccc2)C(=O)N[C@H](CC(C)C)C(=O)N[C@@H](Cc3ccccc3)C(=O)N[C@H](CC(C)C)C(=O)N[C@@H](Cc4c[nH]c5c4cccc5)C(=O)N[C@H](CC(C)C)C(=O)N[C@@H](Cc6c[nH]c7c6cccc7)C(=O)NCCO)NC(=O)CNC(=O)[C@H](C(C)C)NC=O
- InChI: InChI=1S/C97H139N19O17/c1-51(2)38-71(106-84(120)59(17)104-79(119)49-102-94(130)80(55(9)10)103-50-118)87(123)105-60(18)85(121)114-82(57(13)14)96(132)116-83(58(15)16)97(133)115-81(56(11)12)95(131)113-78(45-64-48-101-70-35-27-24-32-67(64)70)93(129)109-72(39-52(3)4)88(124)110-75(42-61-28-20-19-21-29-61)91(127)107-74(41-54(7)8)90(126)112-77(44-63-47-100-69-34-26-23-31-66(63)69)92(128)108-73(40-53(5)6)89(125)111-76(86(122)98-36-37-117)43-62-46-99-68-33-25-22-30-65(62)68/h19-35,46-48,50-60,71-78,80-83,99-101,117H,36-45,49H2,1-18H3,(H,98,122)(H,102,130)(H,103,118)(H,104,119)(H,105,123)(H,106,120)(H,107,127)(H,108,128)(H,109,129)(H,110,124)(H,111,125)(H,112,126)(H,113,131)(H,114,121)(H,115,133)(H,116,132)/t59-,60-,71+,72+,73+,74+,75-,76-,77-,78-,80-,81+,82+,83-/m0/s1; Key:LQSMEVHEYXACJP-DSHASFMGSA-N

Gramicidin B is part of the collective Gramicidin D that is an antibiotic obtained from a soil microbe- Bacillus brevis. This antibiotic forms channels in the cell membrane through which cations inside the cell begin to leave, thus disrupting the ion potential and eventually killing the cell. Gramicidin B makes up 6% of Gramicidin D while Gramicidin A and C make up 80% and 14% respectively. Gramicidin D is a linear pentadecapeptide made up of 15 amino acids. The 11th amino acid in these chains leads to the three different types of gramicidins. Gramicindin A contains tryptophan in the 11th position while B and C have phenylalanine and tyrosine respectively.

== Biosynthesis ==
Gramicidin B is composed of 15 amino acids that alternate between the L and D configuration. It is a linear peptide that is formed by four nonribosomal peptide synthetases (NRPSs), LgrABCD.

The N terminus is protected by a formyl group while the C terminus is protected by an ethanolamine. This is done so that the peptide will not have ‘open ends’ that are subjected to degradation by proteases. It has also been noted that the amino acids that are in Gramicidin B are solely hydrophobic amino acids. This is causes the peptide to be insoluble in water and unable to form zwitterions. Due to the alternating configuration of the amino acids, a beta helix with all the side chains pointing outward is formed.
