= Gramicidin S =

Chemical compound

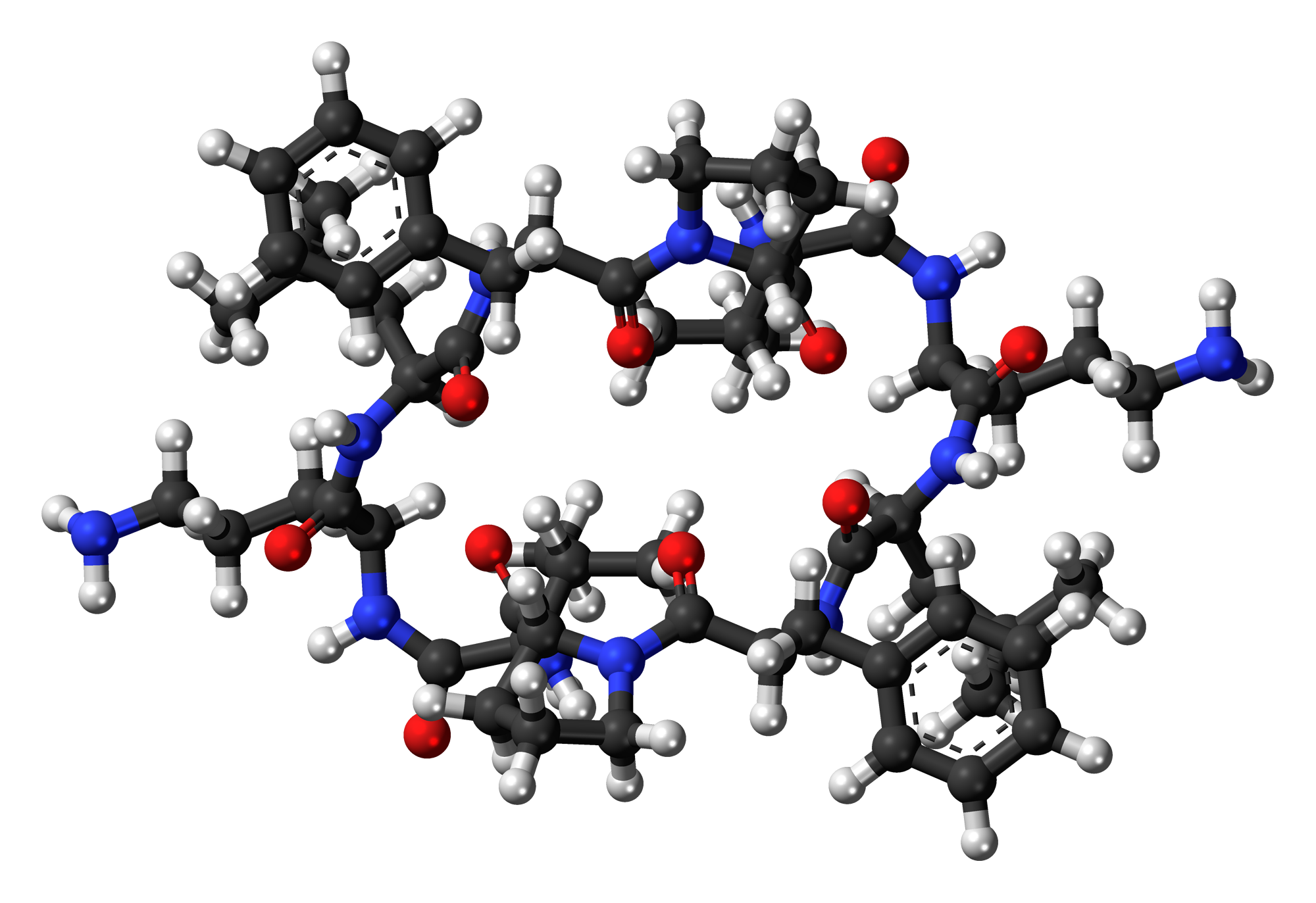

Clinical data
- Routes of administration: Topical

Identifiers
- IUPAC name: Gramicidin S
- CAS Number: 113-73-5
- PubChem CID: 73357
- ChemSpider: 66085
- UNII: WHM29QA23F
- ChEBI: CHEBI:5530
- ChEMBL: ChEMBL373496
- NIAID ChemDB: 002002
- CompTox Dashboard (EPA): DTXSID6046008

Chemical and physical data
- Formula: C_{60}H_{92}N_{12}O_{10}
- Molar mass: 1141.470 g·mol^{−1}
- 3D model (JSmol): Interactive image
- SMILES: CC(C)C[C@H]1C(=O)N[C@@H](C(=O)N2CCC[C@H]2C(=O)N[C@H](C(=O)N[C@H](C(=O)N[C@H](C(=O)N[C@@H](C(=O)N3CCC[C@H]3C(=O)N[C@H](C(=O)N[C@H](C(=O)N1)CCCN)C(C)C)Cc4ccccc4)CC(C)C)CCCN)C(C)C)Cc5ccccc5
- InChI: InChI=1S/C60H92N12O10/c1-35(2)31-43-53(75)67-45(33-39-19-11-9-12-20-39)59(81)71-29-17-25-47(71)55(77)70-50(38(7)8)58(80)64-42(24-16-28-62)52(74)66-44(32-36(3)4)54(76)68-46(34-40-21-13-10-14-22-40)60(82)72-30-18-26-48(72)56(78)69-49(37(5)6)57(79)63-41(23-15-27-61)51(73)65-43/h9-14,19-22,35-38,41-50H,15-18,23-34,61-62H2,1-8H3,(H,63,79)(H,64,80)(H,65,73)(H,66,74)(H,67,75)(H,68,76)(H,69,78)(H,70,77)/t41-,42-,43-,44-,45+,46+,47-,48-,49-,50-/m0/s1; Key:IUAYMJGZBVDSGL-XNNAEKOYSA-N

Gramicidin S or Gramicidin Soviet is an antibiotic that is effective against some gram-positive and gram-negative bacteria as well as some fungi.

It is a derivative of gramicidin, produced by the gram-positive bacterium Brevibacillus brevis. Gramicidin S is a cyclodecapeptide, constructed as two identical pentapeptides joined head to tail, formally written as cyclo(-Val-Orn-Leu-D-Phe-Pro-)_{2}. That is to say, it forms a ring structure composed of five different amino acids, each one used twice within the structure. Another interesting point is that it utilizes two amino acids uncommon in peptides: ornithine as well as the atypical stereoisomer of phenylalanine. It is synthesized by gramicidin S synthetase.

== Biosynthesis ==
Gramicidin S biosynthetic pathway consists of two-enzyme of nonribosomal peptide synthases (NRPSs), gramicidin S synthetase I (GrsA) and gramicidin S synthetase II (GrsB), to give a product as a cyclic decapeptide. Within the biosynthetic pathway, there are total of five modules that specifically recognize, activate, and condense the amino acids to gramicidin S. Starting module GrsA consists of three domains: Adenylation (A) domain where it incorporates the amino acid and activates it by adenylation using ATP, Thiolation (T) domain or peptidyl carrier protein (PCP) in which the adenylated amino acid gets covalently attached to the 4´-phosphopantetheine group and this gets loaded onto the conserved serine in the T domain, Epimerization (E) domain where it epimerizes L-amino acid to D-amino acid. Starting module GrsA loads D-Phe onto the system.

Second enzyme cluster GrsB contains four modules, each containing condensation (C), adenylation (A), and thiolation (T) domains and thioesterase domain (TE) at the end. C domain forms a peptide bond between two amino acids, D-Phe and L-Pro. L-Val, L-Orn, and L-Leu are incorporated sequentially by the next three modules of GrsB. After repeating the whole module synthesis once again, TE domain cyclizes and releases the two peptides and dimerize them together to form the final product.

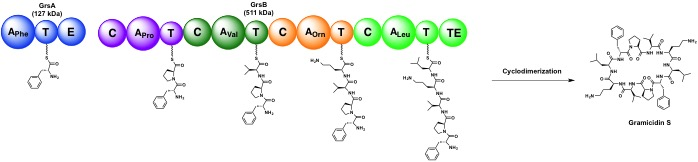
Biosynthetic pathway of gramicidin S

== History ==
Gramicidin S was discovered by Russian microbiologist Georgyi Frantsevitch Gause and his wife Maria Brazhnikova in 1942. Within the year Gramicidin S was being used in Soviet military hospitals to treat infection and eventually found usage at the front lines of combat by 1946. Gause was awarded the Stalin Prize for Medicine for his discovery in 1946. In 1944, Gramicidin S was sent by the Ministry of Health of the USSR to Great Britain via the International Red Cross in a collaborative effort to establish the exact structure. English chemist Richard Synge proved that the compound was an original antibiotic and a polypeptide using paper chromatography. He would later go on to receive the Nobel Prize for his work in chromatography. The crystal structure was finally established by Dorothy Hodgkin and Gerhard Schmidt; Margaret Thatcher worked for a term in 1947 with Gerhard Schmidt on the antibiotic Gramicidin S, as an undergraduate research project. The importance of Gramicidin S and antibiotic research in general was so great that Gause was not persecuted during the period of Lysenkoism in the USSR, while many of his colleagues were. Indeed, it was his need for developing new strains to mass-produce antibiotics that allowed politically sanctioned collaborations with geneticists like Joseph Rapoport and Alexander Malinovsky, who would both actively participate in the downfall of Lysenkoism.

== Structure and pharmacological effect ==
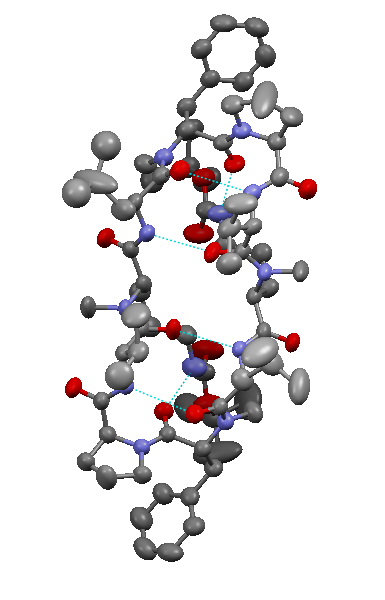
Crystal structure of modified Gramicidin S. Modification includes Boc groups on the ornithine as well as methylation of select amide nitrogens to force cyclic conformation.

Gramicidin S differs from other gramicidin types in that it is a cationic cyclic decapeptide and has a structure of an anti-parallel beta-sheet. Gramicidin S molecule is amphiphilic, with hydrophobic amino acids (D-Phe, Val, Leu side chains) and charged aminoacid (L-Orn). It exhibits strong antibiotic activity towards Gram-negative and Gram-positive and even several pathogenic fungi. The mode of action is not entirely agreed upon, but it is generally accepted that it is disruption of the lipid membrane and enhancement of the permeability of the bacterial cytoplasmic membrane. Unfortunately, being hemolytic at even low concentrations, gramicidin S is only used as topical applications at present. Additionally, Gramicidin S has been employed as a spermicide and therapeutic for genital ulcers caused by sexually transmitted disease.
