= 2,3-Diaminopropionic acid =

l-2,3-Diaminopropanoic acid

Names
- IUPAC name 3-Amino-L-alanine
- Systematic IUPAC name (2S)-2,3-Diaminopropanoic acid

Identifiers
CAS Number	4033-39-0
3D model (JSmol)	Interactive image
ChEBI	CHEBI:16303
ChemSpider	87849
KEGG	C03401
PubChem CID	97328
UNII	JE1TUV83JA
CompTox Dashboard (EPA)	DTXSID80193328
- InChI: InChI=1S/C3H8N2O2/c4-1-2(5)3(6)7/h2H,1,4-5H2,(H,6,7)/t2-/m0/s1 Key: PECYZEOJVXMISF-REOHCLBHSA-N
- SMILES: C([C@@H](C(=O)O)N)N

Properties
Chemical formula	C_{3}H_{8}N_{2}O_{2}
Molar mass	104.109 g·mol^{−1}
- Except where otherwise noted, data are given for materials in their standard state (at 25 °C [77 °F], 100 kPa). Infobox references

2,3-Diaminopropionic acid (2,3-diaminopropionate, Dpr) is a non-proteinogenic amino acid found in certain secondary metabolites, including zwittermicin A and tuberactinomycin.

== Biosynthesis ==
2,3-Diaminopropionate is formed by the pyridoxal phosphate (PLP) mediated amination of serine.

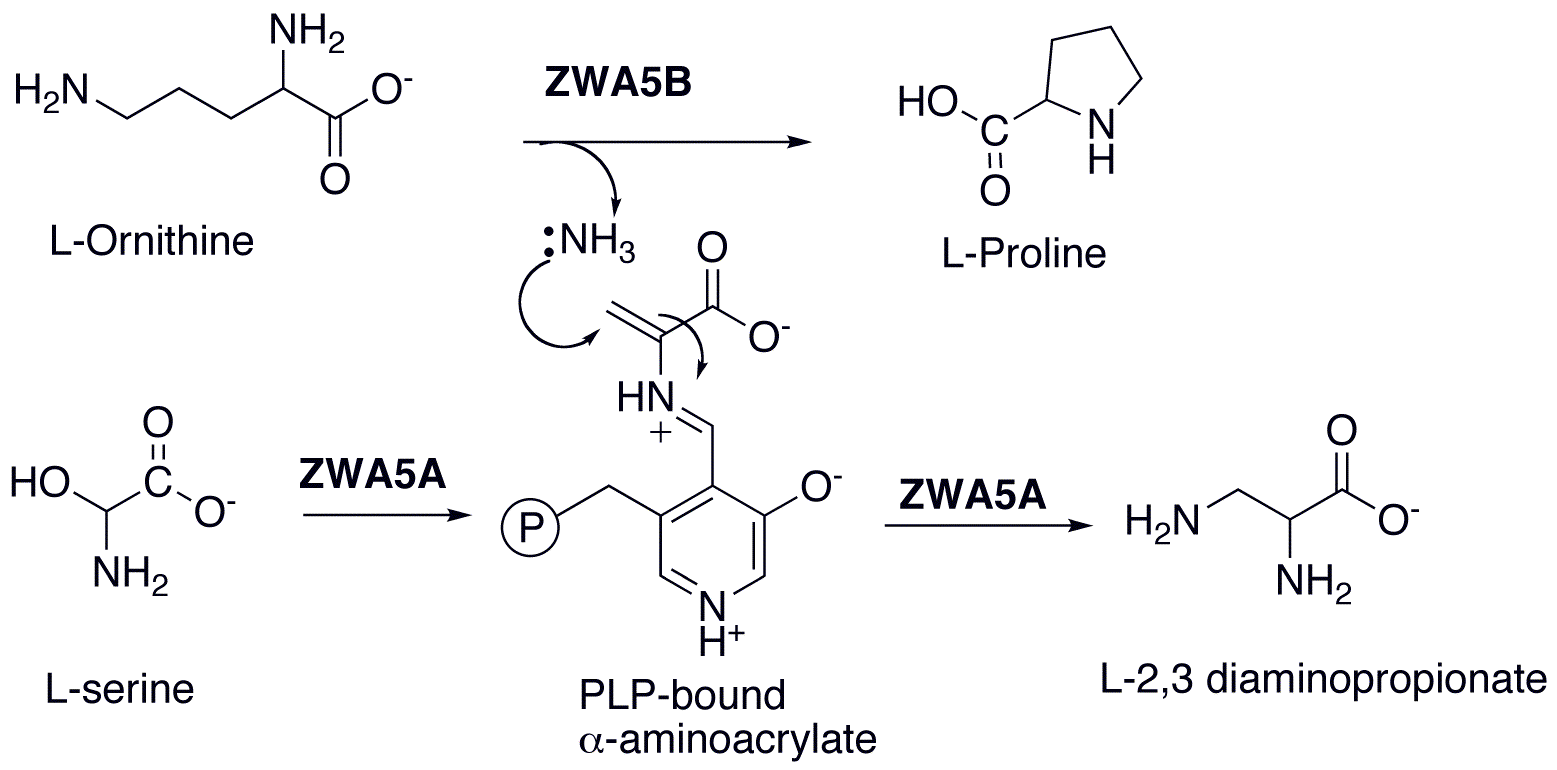
Biosynthesis of l-2,3 Diaminopropionate
