= Tyrothricin =

Chemical compound

Clinical data
- AHFS/Drugs.com: International Drug Names
- ATC code: D06AX08 (WHO) R02AB02 (WHO) S01AA05 (WHO)

Identifiers
- CAS Number: 1404-88-2
- PubChem CID: 452550
- ChemSpider: 398608
- UNII: 877376V2XW
- KEGG: D06262
- ChEMBL: ChEMBL577736
- CompTox Dashboard (EPA): DTXSID4045846
- ECHA InfoCard: 100.014.337

Tyrothricin is an antibiotic mixture which was isolated from Brevibacillus brevis by Rene Dubos in the late 1930s. It was later shown by Dubos and Rollin Hotchkiss to be a mixture of two different antibiotics: gramicidin and tyrocidine.

Both gramicidin and tyrocidine are short polypeptides which disrupt the cell membranes of some, primarily Gram-positive, bacteria. Tyrothricin and its component antibiotics are too toxic to be taken internally but are sometimes used as topical antibiotics.

Tyrothricin, and its component antibiotics, belongs to the pharmacologically related group of polypeptide antibiotic compounds including colistin, polymyxin B, and bacitracin. There is no cross-resistance to these three agents.
