= Viomycin kinase =

Identifiers
- EC no.: 2.7.1.103
- CAS no.: 77000-11-4

Databases
- IntEnz: IntEnz view
- BRENDA: BRENDA entry
- ExPASy: NiceZyme view
- KEGG: KEGG entry
- MetaCyc: metabolic pathway
- PRIAM: profile
- PDB structures: RCSB PDB PDBe PDBsum
- Gene Ontology: AmiGO / QuickGO
Search
- PMC: articles
- PubMed: articles
- NCBI: proteins

In enzymology, viomycin kinase (EC 2.7.1.103) is an enzyme that catalyzes the chemical reaction

ATP + viomycin $\rightleftharpoons$ ADP + O-phosphoviomycin

Thus, the two substrates of this enzyme are ATP and viomycin, whereas its two products are ADP and O-phosphoviomycin.

This enzyme belongs to the family of transferases, specifically those transferring phosphorus-containing groups (phosphotransferases) with an alcohol group as acceptor. The systematic name of this enzyme class is ATP:viomycin O-phosphotransferase. Other names in common use include viomycin phosphotransferase, and capreomycin phosphotransferase.
