= Tyrocidine =

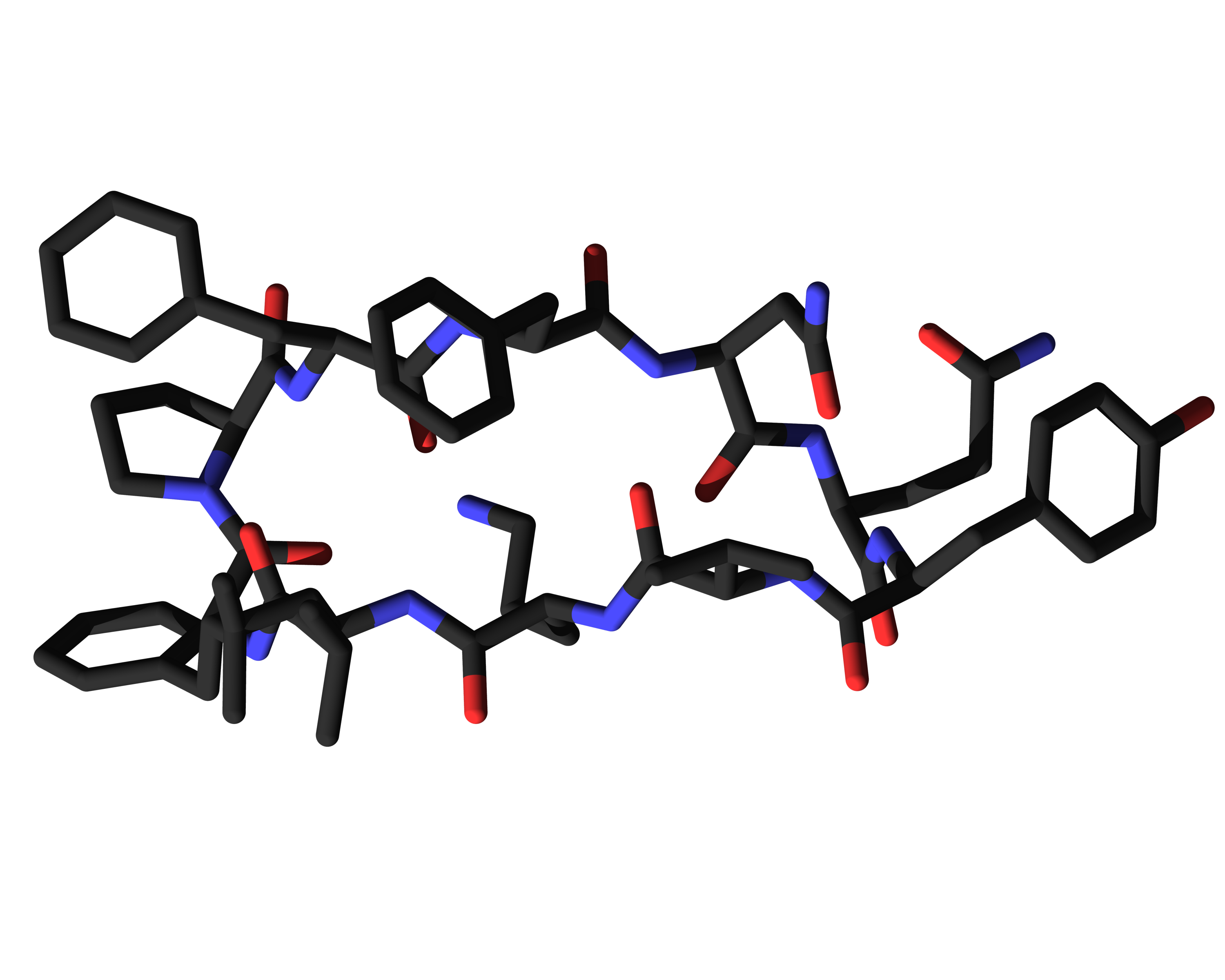

Names
- IUPAC name 3-((3S,6R,9S,12S,15S, 18S,21S,24S,27R,32aS) -9-(2-amino-2-oxoethyl)- 21-(3-aminopropyl)- 3,6,27-tribenzyl-15- (4-hydroxybenzyl)-24-isobutyl- 18-isopropyl- 1,4,7,10,13,16,19,22,25,28- decaoxodotriacontahydropyrrolo[1,2-a] [1,4,7,10,13,16,19,22,25,28] decaazacyclotriacontin- 12-yl)propanamide

Identifiers
| CAS Number | 8011-61-8; A: 1481-70-5; B: 865-28-1; C: 3252-29-7 |
| 3D model (JSmol) | A: Interactive image |
| ChEBI | A: CHEBI:29701 |
| ChEMBL | A: ChEMBL408504 |
| ChemSpider | A: 17286446; B: 24631547; C: 24640331; D: 28533724 |
| EC Number | 232-375-3 |
| KEGG | A: C12041 |
| PubChem CID | A: 16129635 |
| UNII | 0XQ8A2PG8K; A: V134656H89 |
- InChI: A: InChI=1S/C66H87N13O13/c1-38(2)32-47-59(85)77-52(36-42-20-12-7-13-21-42)66(92)79-31-15-23-53(79)64(90)76-49(34-41-18-10-6-11-19-41)61(87)74-48(33-40-16-8-5-9-17-40)60(86)75-51(37-55(69)82)62(88)70-46(28-29-54(68)81)58(84)73-50(35-43-24-26-44(80)27-25-43)63(89)78-56(39(3)4)65(91)71-45(22-14-30-67)57(83)72-47/h5-13,16-21,24-27,38-39,45-53,56,80H,14-15,22-23,28-37,67H2,1-4H3,(H2,68,81)(H2,69,82)(H,70,88)(H,71,91)(H,72,83)(H,73,84)(H,74,87)(H,75,86)(H,76,90)(H,77,85)(H,78,89)/t45-,46-,47-,48+,49-,50-,51-,52+,53-,56-/m0/s1 Key: GSXRBRIWJGAPDU-BBVRJQLQSA-N Computed by InChI 1.0.6 (PubChem release 2021.10.14)
- SMILES: A: CC(C)C[C@H]1C(=O)N[C@@H](C(=O)N2CCC[C@H]2C(=O)N[C@H](C(=O)N[C@@H](C(=O)N[C@H](C(=O)N[C@H](C(=O)N[C@H](C(=O)N[C@H](C(=O)N[C@H](C(=O)N1)CCCN)C(C)C)CC3=CC=C(C=C3)O)CCC(=O)N)CC(=O)N)CC4=CC=CC=C4)CC5=CC=CC=C5)CC6=CC=CC=C6

Properties
| Chemical formula | C_{66}H_{87}N_{13}O_{13} |
| Molar mass | 1270.47628 |
- Except where otherwise noted, data are given for materials in their standard state (at 25 °C [77 °F], 100 kPa). verify (what is ?) Infobox references

Tyrocidine is a mixture of cyclic decapeptides produced by the bacteria Brevibacillus brevis found in soil. It can be composed of 4 different amino acid sequences, giving tyrocidine A–D (See figure 1). Tyrocidine is the major constituent of tyrothricin, which also contains gramicidin. Tyrocidine was the first commercially available antibiotic, but has been found to be toxic toward human blood and reproductive cells. The function of tyrocidine within its host B. brevis is thought to be regulation of sporulation.

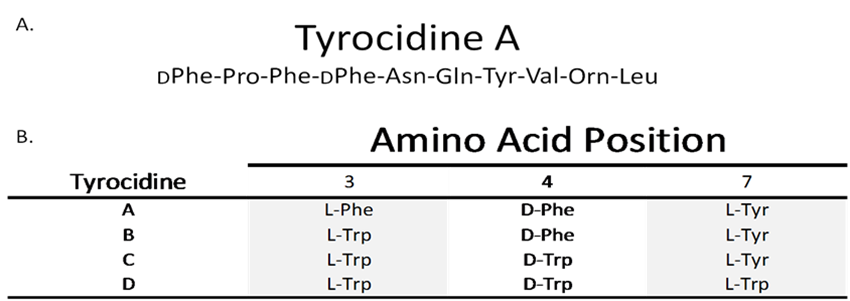
Figure 1: a) Amino acid sequence of tyrocidine A. b) Sequence changes for the 4 types of tyrocidine.

Tyrocidines A, B, and C are cyclic decapeptides. The biosynthesis of tyrocidine involves three enzymes. Parts of its sequence are identical to gramicidin S.

== History ==
In 1939, the American microbiologist René Dubos discovered the soil microbe Bacillus brevis. He observed the ability of the microbe to decompose the capsule of pneumococcus bacterium, rendering it harmless. From the soil microbe B. brevis, he isolated tyrothricin, which had a high toxicity to a large range of bacteria. Tyrothricin was later found to be a mixture of the peptides gramicidin and tyrocidine. These were observed to have toxic effects in red blood cells and reproductive cells in humans, however, if applied externally as an ointment tyrocidine could also be used as a potent antimicrobial agent. Dubos's discovery helped revive interest in research on penicillin.

== Mechanism of action ==
Tyrocidine has a unique mode of action in which it disrupts the cell membrane function, making it a favorable target for engineering derivatives. Tyrocidine appears to perturb the lipid bilayer of a microbe's inner membrane by permeating the lipid phase of the membrane. The exact affinity and location of tyrocidine within the phospholipid bilayer is not yet known.

== Biosynthesis ==
The biosynthesis of tyrocidine is similar to that of gramicidin S, and is achieved through the use of nonribosomal protein synthetases (NRPSs). Its biosynthesis is via an enzymatic assembly consisting of 3 peptide synthetase proteins, TycA, TycB, and TycC, which contain 10 modules. The different tyrocidine analogues (A–D) are not produced by different enzymes, but rather by an enzyme system that is capable of incorporating different amino acids of structural similarity at specified sites. The amino acid sequence is determined by the organization of the enzyme and not by any RNA template.

Figure 2: The tyrocidine operon

The tyrocidine synthetases TycA, TycB, and TycC are encoded on the tyrocidine operon. This consists of the three genes encoding for the three synthetases as well as three additional open reading frames (ORFs). These ORFs, labeled as TycD, TycE, and TycF are downstream of the three synthetase genes (see figure 2). TycD &TycE have the highest similarity to members of the ATP-binding cassette (ABC) transporter family which aid in the transport of substrates across a membrane. It has been suggested that the tandem transporters play a role in conferring resistance in the producer cell through tyrocidine secretion. TycF has been identified as a thioesterase (TE) and is similar to other TEs in bacterial operons used for encoding peptide synthetases. However, the precise function of these TEs remains unknown. The size of the peptide synthetases corresponds to the amount of activation they carry out. TycA is the smallest and activates a single amino acid from one module, TycB is intermediate in size and activates 3 amino acids with 3 modules, and TycC is the largest and activates 6 amino acids with 6 modules (See figure 3).

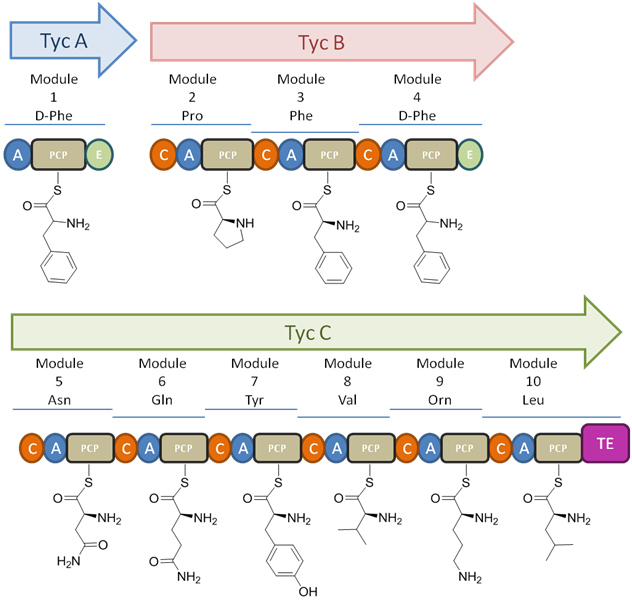
Figure 3: Modules and Domains for Tyrocidine biosynthesis

Each module performs all the catalytic reactions necessary to incorporate a single amino acid onto the peptide chain. This is accomplished through the subdomains for adenylation (A), peptityl carrier protein (PCP), condensation (C), and depending on the amino acid position, an epimerization (E). The adenylation subdomain is used in activating the specific amino acid. Each module uses one molecule of the selected substrate amino acid with one molecule of ATP to give an aminoacyl adenylate enzyme complex and pyrophosphate. The activated amino acid can then be transferred to the enzyme bound 4'-phosphopantetheine of the carrier protein with the expulsion of AMP from the system. The carrier protein uses the 4'-phosphopantetheine prosthetic group for loading of the growing peptide and their monomer precursors. Elongation of the peptide chain is achieved through condensation of the upstream PCP onto an adjacent downstream PCP-bound monomer. Some domains have modification subdomains, such as the E subdomain seen in domains 1 and 4 in tyrocidine, which will generate the D-configured amino acid. On the final module is the TE domain used as a catalyst for cyclization or product release. The release of the product from the carrier protein is achieved through acylation of the active site serine of TE in which the decapeptide is transferred from the thiol ether to the serine residue. Deacylation can then occur through intramolecular cyclization or through hydrolysis to give the cyclic or linear product respectively (See figure 4).

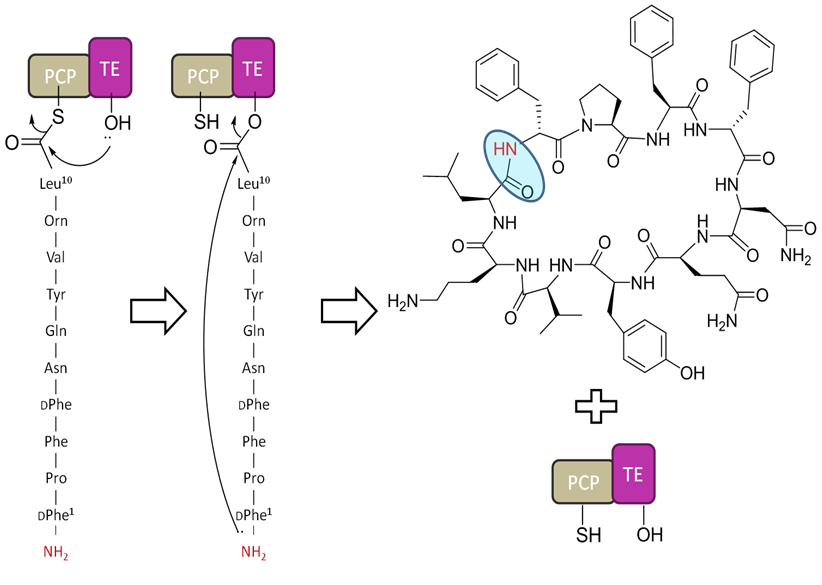
Figure 4: Proposed cyclization reaction catalyzed by thioesterase

In the case of tyrocidine, ring closure has been shown to be highly favorable due to 4 H-bonds helping the decapeptide backbone to adopt a stable conformation (See figure 5). This intramolecular cyclization occurs in a head-to-tail fashion involving the N-terminus of the D-Phe1 and the C-terminus of the L-Leu10 (See figure 4).

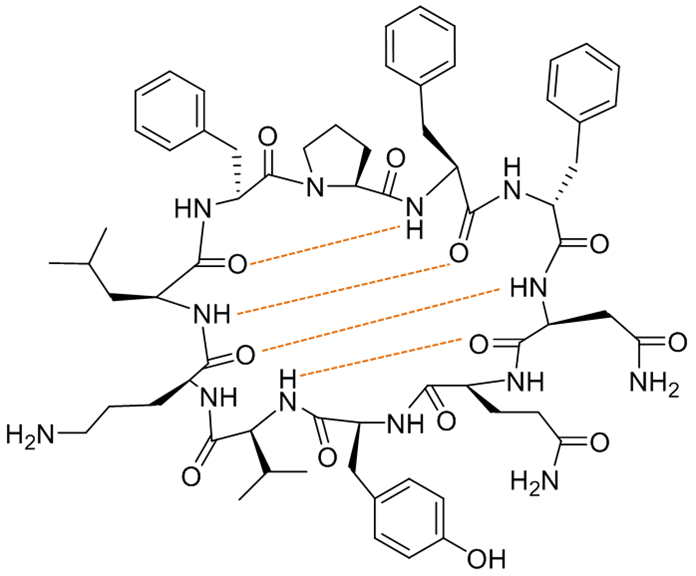
Figure 5: Hydrogen-bonding illustrating stabilizing effects of cyclization

== Chemoenzymatic strategies ==
There is no general biochemical solution for macrocyclization of a peptide chain. Isolated tyrocidine (Tyc) TE domains can be used to cyclize chemically derived peptidyl-thioester substrates, providing a powerful route to new cyclic compounds. In order for this macrocyclization to occur, the peptide chain must be activated at its C-terminus with an N-acetylcysteamine (SNAC) leaving group. An alanine scan through the 10 positions of tyrocidine shows that only the D-Phe and L-Orn are required for sufficient cyclization.

Tyc TE can also be used biomimetically in which it mimics the environment created by the TE domain with the substrate's PCP through use of a synthetic tether linked to a polyethylene glycol (PEG) amide resin. Use of this resin bound to a desired substrate with isolated TE can allow for catalytic release of the resin as well as macrocyclization of the substrate (See figure 6). Use of solid phase peptide synthesis (SPPS) allowed the incorporation of a diverse array of monomers into the peptide chain. Later studies used the high tolerance of Tyc TE in order to modify the peptide backbone post-synthetically. This also allowed for glycosylation of the tyrosine or serine residues to be incorporated. Use of these methods has led to many promising new therapeutic agents.

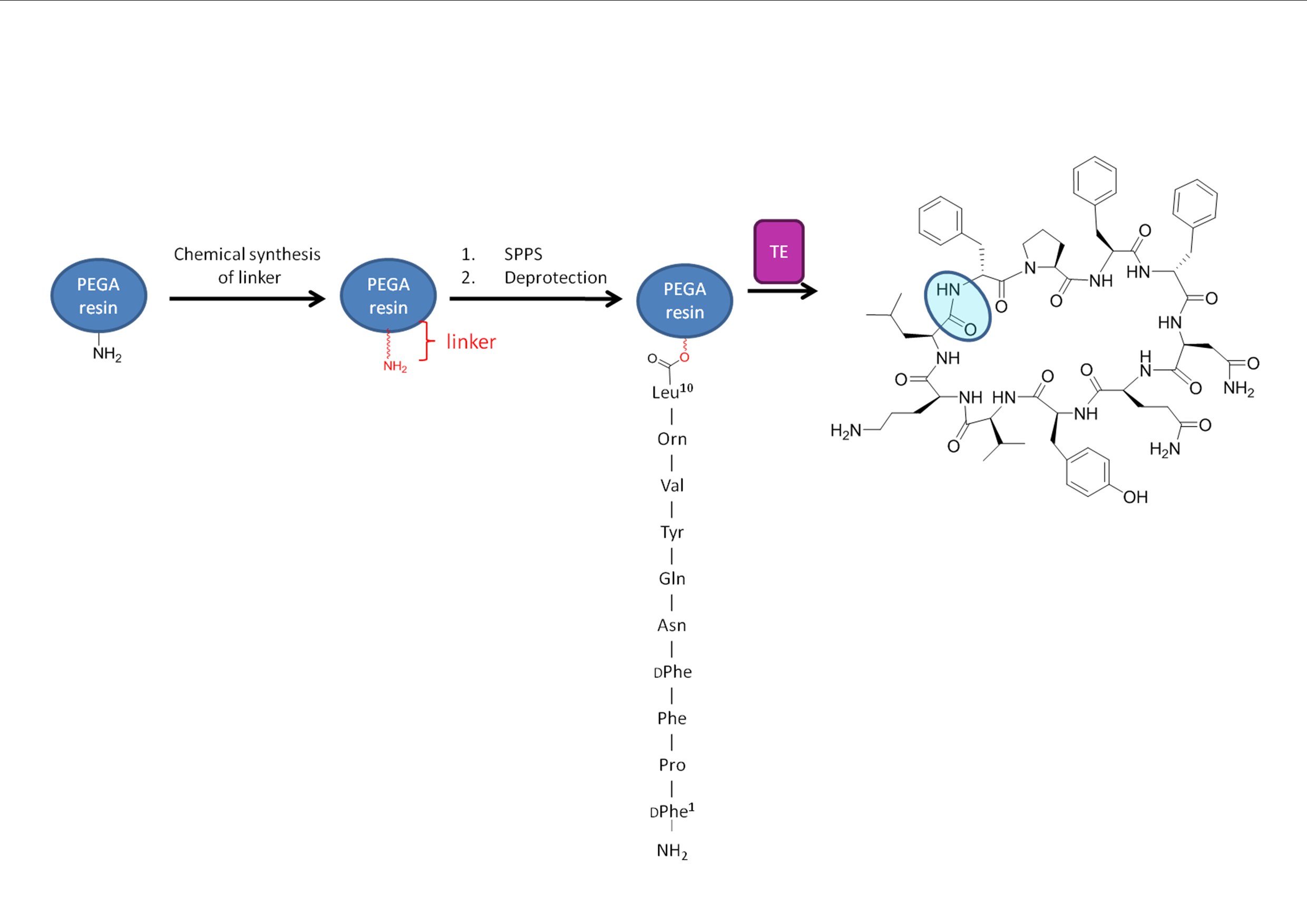
Figure 6: Biomimetic macrocyle synthesis.
