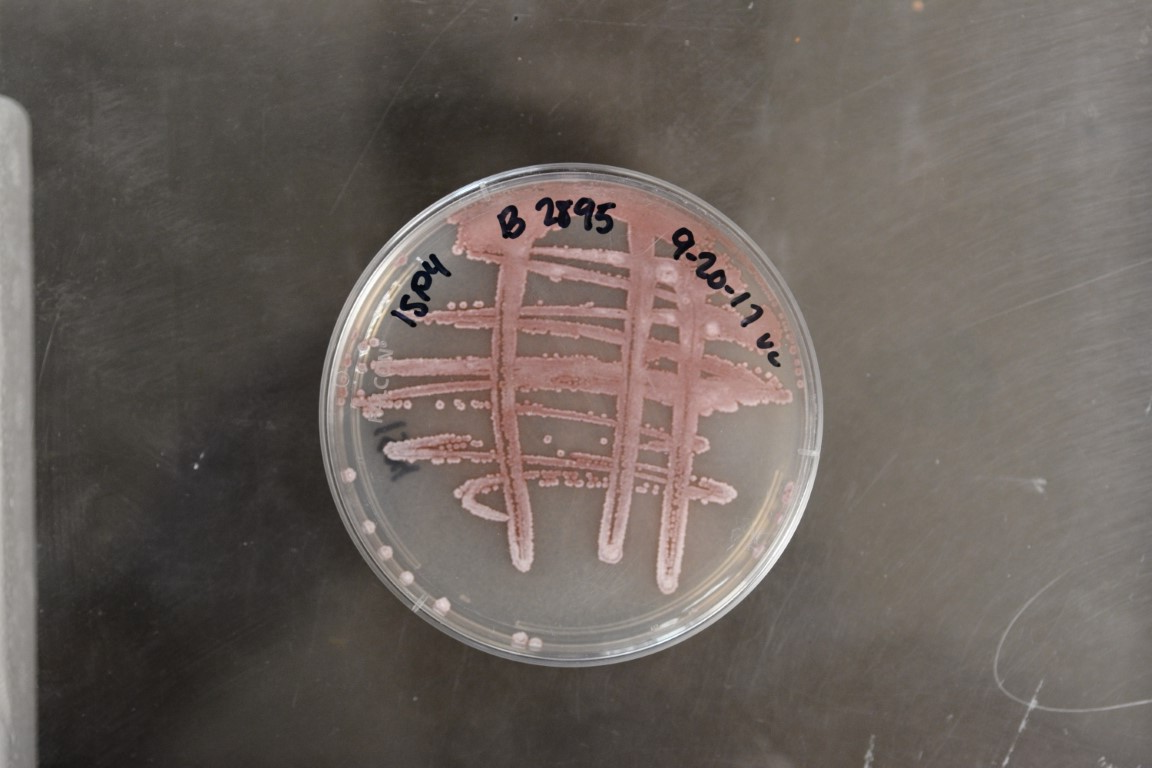

Scientific classification
- Domain: Bacteria
- Kingdom: Bacillati
- Phylum: Actinomycetota
- Class: Actinomycetes
- Order: Streptomycetales
- Family: Streptomycetaceae
- Genus: Streptomyces
- Species: S. puniceus

Binomial name
- Streptomyces puniceus Patelski 1951

Type strain
- ATCC 19801, BCRC 12097, CBS 308.55, CBS 553.68, CCRC 12097, CGMCC 4.1750, DSM 40083, ETH 11884, FD3568, IFO 12811, ISP 5083, JCM 4406, NBRC 12811, NRRL B-2423, NRRL B-2895, NRRL-ISP 5083, Pf 1314-5, Pfizer 1314-5, RIA 1080, UNIQEM 187, VKM Ac-579

Synonyms
- Streptomyces californicus, Streptomyces floridae Actinomyces californicus

= Streptomyces puniceus =

Species of bacterium

Streptomyces puniceus is a bacterium species from the genus of Streptomyces which has been isolated from soil. Streptomyces puniceus produces vinactane and viomycin (viomycin A, viomycin B and viomycin C).

== See also ==
- List of Streptomyces species
