= Inhaled ciclosporin =

Immunosuppressant medication

Ciclosporin is a cyclic polypeptide that has been used widely as an orally-available immunosuppressant. It was originally used to prevent transplant rejection of solid organs but has also found use as an orally administered agent to treat psoriasis, rheumatoid arthritis, dry eye and other auto-immune related conditions. A variety of pre-clinical and clinical studies have been and are investigating its use to treat lung-related disorders via inhalation.

== Formulation ==
Formulation of the drug for inhalation purposes has proved challenging because of ciclosporin's poor aqueous solubility. Consequently, aerosol studies have often employed compatible solvents such as propylene glycol or ethanol as the vehicle for administration by nebulizer or have used more complicated aqueous-based formulations involving liposomes or other dispersions. Dry powder inhaler as well as propellant metered dose inhaler (pMDI) formulations have also been created and evaluated in the laboratory and in early clinical studies.

== Investigational uses ==
Ciclosporin was brought to market in 1983 but the first non human aerosol studies were not published until the late 1980s. These efforts probed the anti-inflammatory and immunosuppressive properties of ciclosporin after regional deposition of drug in the lungs.

=== Asthma ===
Ciclosporin has been touted as a therapeutic option in moderate to severe asthmatic patients as a corticosteroid sparing agent. Preclinical studies bear evidence to the fact that ciclosporin when administered orally or via inhalation is capable of blocking T-cell induced inflammation (e.g. via interleukin-2 and 13 formation), eosinophil and macrophage recruitment in the lungs. Its use to treat asthma via the oral route may be constrained by systemic side-effects but this limitation may be avoided by targeting the lungs with therapeutic doses via inhalation. Pharmacokinetic evidence suggests that peak and trough levels of drug in the circulation are likely to be below the threshold of systemic toxicity. In addition to biomarkers inhaled ciclosporin has been shown to inhibit airway hyperresponsiveness in rodent models and appears to have been well tolerated in volunteers and mild asthmatic patients receiving the drug in single and multiple doses via pMDI. However, as of early 2009 there are no ongoing clinical trials further exploring ciclosporin's utility in asthma; in part, this may be a consequence of sporadic efficacy and side-effects (from oral use) in a condition that is historically managed by steroids.

=== Acute rejection ===
In light of the observations in relation to its use in asthma, the extension of ciclosporin's use to treat early rejection in the lungs was an obvious one, especially considering the increase in lung transplants performed in the USA and Europe since the mid-1980s. Numbers have increased from 33 in 1988 to 1468 in 2007. Furthermore, acute cellular rejection is common after transplantation and will occur in up to 90% of patients and episodes are most likely to occur in the first post-operative year. Consequently, the application of ciclosporin by oral and IV administration has led to efforts to treat acute and acute refractory rejection by direct aerosol administration first in animal models and soon thereafter in transplant patients. Most of these early efforts were carried out by or associated with the University of Pittsburgh Medical Center. A randomized, placebo-controlled trial of aerosolized ciclosporin that was published in the New England Journal of Medicine demonstrated a marked improvement in survival and reduction of chronic rejection incidence, but not in the primary endpoint of acute rejection. This has warranted more detailed investigations of aerosolized drug to treat or prevent the varied conditions of rejection.

=== Chronic rejection ===
Chronic rejection of the lungs differs significantly from acute rejection. The condition is aptly known as bronchiolitis obliterans and clinically is diagnosed as bronchiolitis obliterans syndrome (BOS). Whereas acute rejection exhibits perivascular infiltration of mononuclear cells and attendant inflammation of the surrounding tissue chronic rejection appears to have significant epithelial involvement and is essentially a fibro-proliferative disorder of the small airways. The median survival after a confirmed diagnosis of BOS is just over 2 years. In fact, despite improvements in outcome associated with acute rejection, virtually no improvement in survival has been noted in chronic rejection over the last 20 years. The surprising finding that aerosolized ciclosporin may prevent or delay development of this insidious condition has led to renewed interest with aerosolized ciclosporin formulations and one early stage trial involving a dry powder inhaler is recruiting while another phase III trial involving nebulized ciclosporin in propylene glycol is underway. Early studies have also been conducted with liposome formulations in volunteers and patients.

=== Other ===
Inhaled ciclosporin has also shown promise in several other lung conditions. Early stage studies in mice have shown some benefit of ciclosporin as an adjuvant therapy in lung cancer when administered as a liposome aerosol in conjunction with paclitaxel.
