= Tuberactinomycin =

Tuberactinomycins are a family of cyclic peptide antibiotics known for their effectiveness against drug-resistant tuberculosis. They function by targeting bacterial ribosomes, thereby inhibiting protein synthesis.

== See also ==
- Viomycin, the first tuberactinomycin found
- Enviomycin, also known as tuberactinomycin N
