= Gerhard Schmidt (crystallographer) =

Gerhard Martin Julius Schmidt
- גרהרד מרטין יוליוס שמידט
- Born: August 21, 1919; Berlin, Germany
- Died: July 12, 1971 (aged 51); Zurich, Switzerland
- Resting place: Rehovot, Israel
- Education: University of Oxford (Oriel College)
- Known for: Combining crystallography with chemistry and photochemistry
- Spouse: Esther Schmidt
- Scientific career
- Fields: X-ray crystallography, organic chemistry, solid-state chemistry
- Workplaces: Weizmann Institute of Science
- Doctoral advisor: Robert Robinson; Dorothy Hodgkin

Gerhard Martin Julius Schmidt (Hebrew: גרהרד מרטין יוליוס שמידט; 21 August 1919 in Berlin – 12 July 1971, in Zurich, buried in Rehovot), was an organic chemist and chemical crystallographer, dean of the chemistry faculty of the Weizmann Institute of Science, and its scientific director in 1969. Schmidt was the founder of X-ray crystallography at the Weizmann Institute and in Israel – a field in which Weizmann Institute's Professor Ada Yonath was awarded the Nobel Prize in Chemistry for 2009.

== Early years ==
Schmidt was born in Berlin in 1919 and went to high school in Munich, where his father was a professor of chemistry. Being the son of a Jewish mother, Gerhard was forced to leave Germany at the age of 16, after the Nazis came to power; he spent a year in Switzerland, then moved to England, where he finished high school in 1938. He then won a scholarship to study at the University of Oxford (Oriel College). He earned a master's degree in organic chemistry in 1942 under the guidance of Robert Robinson, and a doctorate in X-ray crystallography under Dorothy Hodgkin in 1948. Both of his supervisors were later awarded Nobel Prizes in chemistry.

During his doctoral studies, Schmidt took part in structural studies of biologically important molecules, focusing on the structure of the antibacterial natural peptide Gramicidin S using the method of X-ray crystallography. During this period he supervised another student of Hodgkin, Margaret Roberts, later Margaret Thatcher.

After the breakout of World War II, Schmidt was forced to interrupt his studies. Being an emigrant from Germany, he was deported in July 1940, together with 200 other “enemy aliens,” to a detention camp in Australia. In August 1941, he was finally cleared and returned to England. Later in life, Schmidt liked to date some of his most original ideas in chemistry to this deportation period.

== Appointments and honors ==
Schmidt arrived in Israel and joined the soon-to-be-dedicated Weizmann Institute in late 1948. He had been invited by Ernst Bergmann, then the Institute's scientific director, to set up a research group in chemical crystallography. He later gradually broadened his activities to include solid-state chemistry and crystal spectroscopy.

At the Weizmann Institute, Schmidt combined scientific research with holding senior administrative positions. From 1959 to 1961, he served as chairman of the Institute's Scientific Committee and its administrative director. He was appointed head of the Department of Chemistry in 1967 and, with the establishment of the chemistry faculty in 1970, became its first dean. In 1969 he served as the Scientific Director of the Weizmann Institute. In 1970 this position was absorbed into the President position, and Schmidt became a Dean of the Chemistry Faculty.

In the late 1950s, while serving as Weizmann's Administrative Director, Schmidt was among the pioneers of the German-Israeli scientific collaboration, which began with ties between the Weizmann Institute and the Max Planck Society. This initiative led to the creation of the Minerva Stiftung in 1964 and paved the way for the establishment of formal relations between Israel and Germany in 1965. Schmidt devoted considerable time to applied science. From 1960 to 1964, he chaired the Board of Yeda Research & Development Co., the Weizmann Institute's technology transfer arm.

Outside the Weizmann Institute, Schmidt was actively involved in Israel's scientific and technological development. From 1960 to 1968, he served on the board of directors of the Dead Sea Works. In 1967, he became a member of the executive committee of the new Center for Industrial Research in Haifa. In addition, from 1967 to 1969, he chaired two committees established by Israel's National Council for Research and Development – on technical applications of photochemistry and on bromine chemistry. He founded the Israel Crystallography Society and was its first President (1958-1960), negotiating its adherence to the International Union of Crystallography.

In 1963, he received the Weizmann Prize in the Exact Sciences from Tel Aviv municipality for his research on the structure and chemical behavior of crystals.

The Weizmann Institute has established the annual Gerhard M. J. Schmidt Memorial Lecture held in the Schmidt Lecture Hall, and the Gerhard M.J. Schmidt Minerva Center on Supramolecular Architectures, which supports collaboration between Weizmann faculty and German scientists.

== Scientific research ==
Professor Schmidt is recognized as one of the founders of modern organic solid-state chemistry. At the Weizmann Institute, the work of his group centered around the development of X-ray crystallographic methods for the determination of molecular structures in order to understand the properties and reactivity of organic solids.

In the early 1950s, Schmidt investigated the structure and chemistry of over-crowded molecules and their activity. In other studies, he discovered a correlation between the crystalline structure and the symmetry of photochemical products. This finding helped in understanding chemical reactions in organized systems. He then coined the term “topochemistry” for this kind of reaction.

In his research, Schmidt sought to clarify the way by which the structure of molecules affects their packing mode in the crystal. During these studies, he revealed the occurrence of halogen-halogen interactions. Later, he coined the term “crystal engineering,” suggesting that by understanding the ways in which molecules interact, it should be possible to design packing motifs in crystals for rational planning of solid-state reactions. This approach was implemented successfully in the first “absolute” asymmetric synthesis in crystals.

Schmidt's achievements stemmed from his earlier ideas recognizing the importance of combining chemistry with molecular geometry. He also suggested that an ordered arrangement of reactive units in space was the key to understanding biological processes such as photosynthesis and enzymatic activity.
