= Jean Porter Dubos =

American biologist and environmentalist (1918–1988)

Jean Porter Dubos (January 1, 1918 – August 6, 1988) was an American biologist and environmentalist.

Jean Porter was born in Upper Sandusky, Ohio. She attended Ohio State University and graduated with a bachelor of arts in 1938. In 1946, she married René Dubos.

Dubos joined the Dubos Laboratory at the Harvard Medical School in 1942 and joined Rockefeller Institute two years later. Together with her husband René Dubos, Dubos cofounded the tuberculosis laboratory, the Rockefeller Institute for Medical Research.

Being a tuberculosis survivor herself, Dubos dedicated her studies in the social and environmental history of the disease, and co-authored The White Plague - Tuberculosis, Man and Society with René Dubos. Her work put emphasis on the socioenvironmental aspects of diseases and was considered a pioneer in the social history of medicine.

Dubos was a founder of the Rene Dubos Center for Human Environments.

Dubos led the establishment of the Dubos Point Wildlife Sanctuary. The sanctuary is named to honor Rene and Jean Dubos and corresponds with the Dubos' vision of "Think Globally, Act Locally."

Dubos died at 70 on August 6, 1988 at her home in Manhattan due to ovarian cancer.
