= Streptomyces vinaceus =

Scientific classification
- Domain: Bacteria
- Kingdom: Bacillati
- Phylum: Actinomycetota
- Class: Actinomycetes
- Order: Streptomycetales
- Family: Streptomycetaceae
- Genus: Streptomyces
- Species: S. vinaceus

Binomial name
- Streptomyces vinaceus Jones 1952

Type strain
- AS 4.1305, ATCC 27476, BCRC 11865, CBS 726.72, CCRC 11865, CGMCC 4.1305, DSM 40515, ETH 28394, HUT-6082, IFO 13425, ISP 5515, JCM 4090, JCM 4849, JUT 6082, KCCM 40263, KCTC 9771, NBRC 13425, NRRL 2382, NRRL B-2382, NRRL-ISP 5515, PCM 2366, RIA 1386, RIA 805

Synonyms
- Streptomyces arabicus

Species of bacterium

Streptomyces vinaceus is a bacterium species from the genus of Streptomyces. Streptomyces vinaceus produces vitamin B12, viomycin, amicetin and citreamycin delta.

== See also ==
- List of Streptomyces species
