= Gramicidin =

Mix of ionophoric antibiotics

- Gramicidin A head-to-head dimer

Identifiers
- Symbol: N/A
- TCDB: 1.D.1
- OPM superfamily: 65
- OPM protein: 1grm

Gramicidin
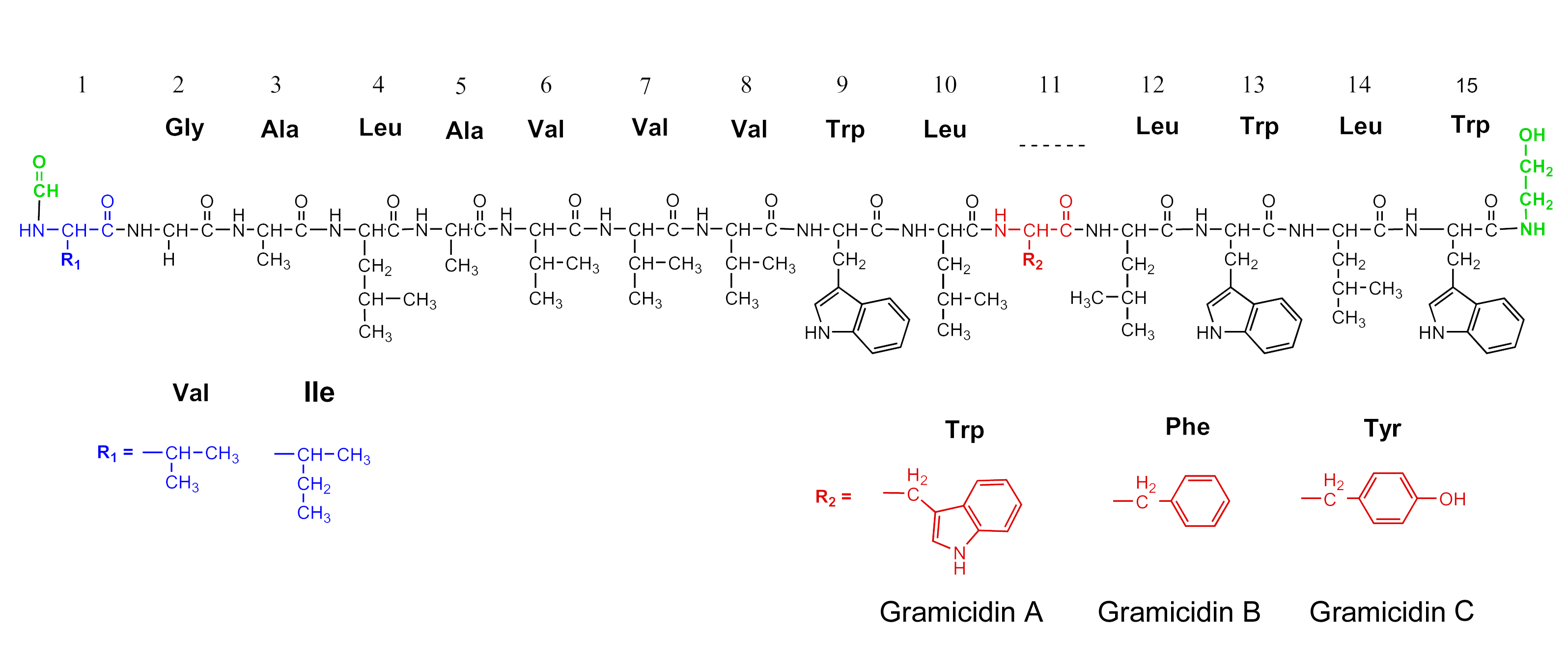
- Structure of gramicidin A, B, and C (click to enlarge)

Clinical data
- ATC code: R02AB30 (WHO)

Identifiers
- CAS Number: 1405-97-6
- PubChem CID: 16130140
- DrugBank: DB00027
- ChemSpider: 3076403
- UNII: 5IE62321P4
- KEGG: D04369
- ChEMBL: ChEMBL557217
- ECHA InfoCard: 100.014.355

Chemical and physical data
- Formula: C_{99}H_{140}N_{20}O_{17}
- Molar mass: 1882.332 g·mol^{−1}
- 3D model (JSmol): Interactive image
- Melting point: 229 to 230 °C (444 to 446 °F)
- Solubility in water: 6 mg/L
- SMILES: C[C@@H](C(=O)N[C@H](CC(C)C)C(=O)N[C@@H](C)C(=O)N[C@H](C(C)C)C(=O)N[C@@H](C(C)C)C(=O)N[C@@H](C(C)C)C(=O)N[C@@H](CC1=CNC2=CC=CC=C21)C(=O)N[C@H](CC(C)C)C(=O)N[C@@H](CC3=CNC4=CC=CC=C43)C(=O)N[C@H](CC(C)C)C(=O)N[C@@H](CC5=CNC6=CC=CC=C65)C(=O)N[C@H](CC(C)C)C(=O)N[C@@H](CC7=CNC8=CC=CC=C87)C(=O)NCCO)NC(=O)CNC(=O)[C@H](C(C)C)NC=O
- InChI: InChI=1S/C60H92N12O10/c1-35(2)31-43-53(75)67-45(33-39-19-11-9-12-20-39)59(81)71-29-17-25-47(71)55(77)70-50(38(7)8)58(80)64-42(24-16-28-62)52(74)66-44(32-36(3)4)54(76)68-46(34-40-21-13-10-14-22-40)60(82)72-30-18-26-48(72)56(78)69-49(37(5)6)57(79)63-41(23-15-27-61)51(73)65-43/h9-14,19-22,35-38,41-50H,15-18,23-34,61-62H2,1-8H3,(H,63,79)(H,64,80)(H,65,73)(H,66,74)(H,67,75)(H,68,76)(H,69,78)(H,70,77); Key:IUAYMJGZBVDSGL-UHFFFAOYSA-N

Gramicidin, also called gramicidin D, is a mix of ionophoric antibiotics, gramicidin A, B and C, which make up about 80%, 5%, and 15% of the mix, respectively. Each has 2 isoforms, so the mix has 6 different types of gramicidin molecules. They can be extracted from Brevibacillus brevis soil bacteria. Gramicidins are linear peptides with 15 amino acids. This is in contrast to unrelated gramicidin S, which is a cyclic peptide.

== Medical uses ==
Gramicidins work as antibiotics against gram-positive bacteria like Bacillus subtilis and Staphylococcus aureus, but not well against gram-negative ones like E. coli.

Gramicidins are used in medicinal lozenges for sore throat and in topical medicines to treat infected wounds. Gramicidins are often mixed with other antibiotics like tyrocidine and antiseptics. Gramicidins are also used in eye drops for bacterial eye infections. In drops, they are often mixed with other antibiotics like polymyxin B or neomycin. Multiple antibiotics increase efficiency against various strains of bacteria. Such eye-drops are also used to treat eye infections of animals, like horses.

== History ==
In 1939, René Dubos isolated the substance tyrothricin. Later this was shown to be a mix of gramicidin and tyrocidine. These were the first antibiotics to be manufactured commercially. Letter "D" in gramicidin D is short for "Dubos", and was invented to differentiate the mix from gramicidin S.

In 1964, the sequence of gramicidin A was determined by Reinhard Sarges and Bernhard Witkop.

In 1971, the dimeric head-to-head structure of gramicidins was proposed by D. W. Urry.

In 1993, the structure of the gramicidin head-to-head dimer in micelles and lipid bilayers was determined by solution and solid-state NMR.

== Structure and chemistry ==
Gramicidins A, B and C are nonribosomal peptides, thus they have no genes. They consist of 15 L- and D-amino acids. Their amino acid sequence is:

formyl-L-X-Gly-L-Ala-D-Leu-L-Ala-D-Val-L-Val-D-Val-L-Trp-D-Leu-L-Y-D-Leu-L-Trp-D-Leu-L-Trp-ethanolamine

Y is L-tryptophan in gramicidin A, L-phenylalanine in B and L-tyrosine in C. X determines isoform. X is L-valine or L-isoleucine – in natural gramicidin mixes of A, B and C, about 5% of the total gramicidins are isoleucine isoforms.

Gramicidin helices. Antiparallel (left) and parallel double helices and the helix dimer present in lipid bilayers. C and N are C- and N-terminals.

Gramicidins form helices. The alternating pattern of D- and L-amino acids is important for the formation of these structures. Helices occur most often as head-to-head dimers. 2 gramicidins can also form antiparallel or parallel double helices, especially in organic solvents. Dimers are long enough to span cellular lipid bilayers and thus function as ion channel -type of ionophores.

Gramicidin mixture is a crystalline solid. Its solubility in water is minimal, 6 mg/L, and it may form colloidal suspensions. It is soluble in small alcohols, acetic acid, pyridine, poorly soluble in acetone and dioxane, and practically insoluble in diethylether and hydrocarbons.

== Pharmacological effect ==
Gramicidins are ionophores. Their dimers form ion channel-like pores in cell membranes and cellular organelles of bacteria and animal cells. Inorganic monovalent ions, such as potassium (K^{+}) and sodium (Na^{+}), can travel through these pores freely via diffusion. This destroys vital ion concentration differences, i.e. ion gradients, between membranes thereby killing the cell via various effects. For example, ion leak in mitochondria halts mitochondrial ATP production in cells with mitochondria.

Gramicidins can be used as topical antibiotic medications in low doses, even though they are potentially lethal for human cells. Bacteria die at lower gramicidin concentrations than human cells. Gramicidins are not used internally, as their significant intake may cause hemolysis and be toxic to the liver, kidney, meninges and olfactory system among other effects.
