= Chameleon (molecular) =

In the field of chemistry, a chameleon is a molecule that can adopt different conformations in response to being exposed to different environments. In an aqueous environment, chameleon molecules expose polar hydrophilic groups. Conversely in hydrophobic environments such as the interior of cell membranes, chameleon molecules expose hydrophobic groups.

Examples of molecules with chameleon properties include cyclic peptides such as the drug cyclosporin A. This chameleon property allows the drug to dissolve in water and then traverse the hydrophobic intestinal epithelium bilayer and then dissolve in blood serum, allowing high oral bioavailability. These same properties then allow diffusion across the lipid bilayer and to achieve high intracellular concentrations in the target cells increasing the potency of these drugs.

Chameleonicity may also contribute increased bioavailability and membrane permeability of PROTACs.
