= So Human an Animal =

1968 nonfiction book by René Dubos

So Human An Animal
- Author: René Dubos
- Language: English
- Publisher: Scribner
- Publication date: 1968/new edition 1998
- Publication place: United States
- Pages: 267
- ISBN: 978-0765804297

So Human an Animal: How We Are Shaped by Surroundings and Events, is a book written by René Dubos and published by Scribner in 1968. It won the 1969 Pulitzer Prize for General Nonfiction.

== Themes ==
In the book, Dubos, a microbiologist and pathologist, explores the thesis that technology is dehumanizing us and that science needs to be humanized. In his 1976 book The Existential Pleasures of Engineering, American engineer and writer Samuel C. Florman identifies this book as "an important feature of the antitechnology crusade".
