= Think globally, act locally =

Slogan

"Think globally, act locally" or "Think global, act local" is a phrase that has been used in various contexts, including planning, environment, community empowerment, education, mathematics, business and the church.

== Definition ==
"Think globally, act locally" urges people to consider the health of the entire planet and to take action in their own communities and cities. Long before governments began enforcing environmental laws, individuals were coming together to protect habitats and the organisms that live within them. These efforts are referred to as grassroots efforts; they occur on a local level and are primarily run by volunteers and helpers.

"Think Globally, Act Locally" originally began at the grassroots level; however, it is now a global concept with high importance. It is not just volunteers who take the environment into consideration. Corporations, government officials, education system, and local communities also see the importance of taking necessary actions that can impact positively the environment.

Warren Heaps states, "It's really important to recognize that markets are different around the world, and company compensation programs should reflect a balance between global corporate philosophy and local practice and culture".

== Origins of the phrase ==
The origins of the phrase are not certain. It is widely attributed to the environmentalist David Brower, and was adopted as a slogan by Friends of the Earth, which he founded in 1969. Some have attributed it to the eminent biologist René Dubos in 1977. Another possible originator is the French theologian Jacques Ellul. The Canadian futurist Frank Feather, who chaired a conference called "Thinking Globally, Acting Locally" in 1979, has claimed credit for the expression.

== Origin in town planning ==
One of the originators of the "Think globally, act locally" concept in social science was Patrick Geddes, the Scottish biologist, sociologist, and pioneer of urban planning as a social science discipline. Although the exact phrase does not appear in Geddes' 1915 book Cities in Evolution, the idea (as applied to city planning) is clearly evident: "'Local character' is thus no mere accidental old-world quaintness, as its mimics think and say. It is attained only in course of adequate grasp and treatment of the whole environment, and in active sympathy with the essential and characteristic life of the place concerned." Geddes was also responsible for introducing the concept of "region" to architecture and planning. He made significant contributions to the consideration of the environment. Geddes believed in working with the environment, versus working against it.

Town planning is important to understanding of the idea "think globally, act locally". Urban management and development highly impacts the surrounding environment. The ways in which this is initiated is vital to the health of the environment. Corporations need to be aware of global communities when expanding their companies to new locations. Not only do corporations need to be aware of global differences, but also Urban and rural areas who plan on expanding or changing the dynamics of their community. As stated "Addressing the complex urban environmental problems, in order to improve urban livability through Urban Environmental Strategies (UES), involves taking stock of the existing urban environmental problems, their comparative analysis and prioritization, setting out objectives and targets, and identification of various measures to meet these objectives".

== Education ==
The term was increasingly applied to initiatives in international education and was advanced by Stuart Grauer in his 1989 University of San Diego publication, "Think Globally, Act Locally: A Delphi Study of Educational Leadership Through the Development of International Resources in the Local Community". In this publication it was attributed to Harlan Cleveland.

It is not only corporations that are acknowledging the importance of environmental issues, but also the education system. Government officials and school boards across the world are beginning to develop a new way of teaching. Globalization is now thought of as an important concept to understanding the world. Certain schools believe it is important to discuss global issues as young as 5 years old. It is students who are our future; therefore understanding the concept of "think globally, act locally" is fundamental to our future.

== Business ==
The term is also used in business strategy, where multinational corporations are encouraged to build local roots. This is sometimes expressed by converging the words "global" and "local" into the single word "glocal", a term used by several companies (coined by Akio Morita, founder of Sony Corporation) in their advertising and branding strategies in the 1980s and 1990s.

Currently more and more corporations are finding it extremely important to analyze the environmental damage of their company. The pressure they receive from government officials and local communities regarding environmental issues is vital to their company's image. Globalization is an emerging concept throughout the business world. It was first developed by the Japanese; however, it has now emerged throughout Western society. Globalization refers to the practice of conducting business according to both local and global considerations.

== Church ==
While the Christian church has traditionally "thought globally and acted locally", some Christian leaders have reversed the slogan by suggesting that the church should "think locally and act globally" by encouraging the empowerment of local leaders e.g. on a multi-site campus, rather than trying to direct and equip them centrally.

== Variations ==
For many environmental activists, the phrase has been changed into "act globally, act local" due to the growing concern for the whole planet and thus the need of activism everywhere in the world.

== See also ==
- Global citizenship
- Green politics
- Netherlands fallacy
