= Nonribosomal peptide =

Secondary metabolides

Nonribosomal peptides (NRP) are a class of peptide secondary metabolites, usually produced by microorganisms like bacteria and fungi. Nonribosomal peptides are also found in higher organisms, such as nudibranchs, but are thought to be made by bacteria inside these organisms. While there exist a wide range of peptides that are not synthesized by ribosomes, the term nonribosomal peptide typically refers to a very specific set of these as discussed in this article.

Nonribosomal peptides are synthesized by nonribosomal peptide synthetases, which, unlike the ribosomes, are independent of messenger RNA. Each nonribosomal peptide synthetase can synthesize only one type of peptide. Nonribosomal peptides often have cyclic and/or branched structures, can contain non-proteinogenic amino acids including D-amino acids, carry modifications like N-methyl and N-formyl groups, or are glycosylated, acylated, halogenated, or hydroxylated. Cyclization of amino acids against the peptide "backbone" is often performed, resulting in oxazolines and thiazolines; these can be further oxidized or reduced. On occasion, dehydration is performed on serines, resulting in dehydroalanine. This is just a sampling of the various manipulations and variations that nonribosomal peptides can perform. Nonribosomal peptides are often dimers or trimers of identical sequences chained together or cyclized, or even branched.

Nonribosomal peptides are a very diverse family of natural products with an extremely broad range of biological activities and pharmacological properties. They are often toxins, siderophores, or pigments. Nonribosomal peptide antibiotics, cytostatics, and immunosuppressants are in commercial use.

== Examples ==
- Antibiotics
  - Actinomycin
  - Bacitracin
  - Calcium dependent antibiotic
  - Daptomycin
  - Vancomycin
  - Teixobactin
  - Tyrocidine
  - Gramicidin
  - Zwittermicin A
- Antibiotic precursors
  - ACV-Tripeptide
- Cytostatics
  - Epothilone
  - Fabclavine
  - Bleomycin
- Immunosuppressants
  - Ciclosporin (Cyclosporine A)
- Siderophores
  - Pyoverdine
  - Enterobactin
  - Myxochelin A
- Pigments
  - Indigoidine
- Toxins
  - Microcystins and
  - Nodularins, cyanotoxins from cyanobacteria.
- Nitrogen storage polymers
  - Cyanophycin – produced by some cyanobacteria
- Phytotoxins
  - HC-toxin – a virulence factor made by the plant pathogenic fungus Cochliobolus (Helminthosporium) carbonum
  - AM-toxin – made by the plant pathogenic fungus Alternaria alternata pv. Mali
  - victorin – a chlorinated cyclic pentapeptide made by the pathogenic fungus Cochliobolus victoriae. Its nonribosomal synthesis has not been established.
- Antioxidant
  - Glutathione

== Biosynthesis ==
Nonribosomal peptides are synthesized by one or more specialized nonribosomal peptide-synthetase (NRPS) enzymes. The NRPS genes for a certain peptide are usually organized in one operon in bacteria and in gene clusters in eukaryotes. However, the first fungal NRP discovered, ciclosporin, is synthesized by a single 1.6MDa NRPS. The enzymes are organized in modules that are responsible for the introduction of one additional amino acid. Each module consists of several domains with defined functions, separated by short spacer regions of about 15 amino acids.

The biosynthesis of nonribosomal peptides shares characteristics with the polyketide and fatty acid biosynthesis. Due to these structural and mechanistic similarities, some nonribosomal peptide synthetases contain polyketide synthase modules for the insertion of acetate or propionate-derived subunits into the peptide chain.

The huge NRPSs containing several modules are called "type I". Those existing as separate enzymes (as well as a separate peptidyl carrier protein) are called "type II". As many as 10% of bacterial NRPS are type II.

Some (type I) NRPS modules deviate from the standard domain structure, and some extra domains have been described. There are also NRPS enzymes that serve as a scaffold for other modifications to the substrate to incorporate unusual amino acids.

=== Modules ===
The order of modules and domains of a complete type I nonribosomal peptide synthetase is as follows:

- Initiation or Starting module: [F/NMT]-A-PCP-
- Elongation or Extending modules: -(C/Cy)-[NMT]-A-PCP-[E]-
- Termination or Releasing module: -(TE/R)

(Order: N-terminus to C-terminus; []: optionally; (): alternatively)

=== Domains ===
- F: Formylation (optional)
- A: Adenylation (required in a module)
- PCP: Thiolation and peptide carrier protein with attached 4'-phospho-pantetheine (required in a module)
- C: Condensation forming the amide bond (required in a module)
- Cy: Cyclization into thiazoline or oxazolines (optional)
- Ox: Oxidation of thiazolines or oxazolines to thiazoles or oxazoles (optional)
- Red: Reduction of thiazolines or oxazolines to thiazolidines or oxazolidines (optional)
- E: Epimerization into D-amino acids (optional)
- NMT: N-methylation (optional)
- TE: Termination by a thio-esterase (only found once in a NRPS)
- R: Reduction to terminal aldehyde or alcohol (optional)
- X: Recruits cytochrome P450 enzymes (optional)

=== Starting stage ===
- Loading: The first amino acid is activated with ATP as a mixed acyl-phosphoric acid anhydride with AMP by the A-domain and loaded onto the serine-attached 4'-phospho-pantethine (4'PP) sidechain of the PCP-domain catalyzed by the PCP-domain (thiolation).
- Some A domains require interaction with MbtH-like proteins for their activity.
- Sometimes the amino group of the bound amino acid is formylated by an F-domain or methylated by an NMT-domain.

=== Elongation stages ===
- Loading: Analogous to the starting stage, each module loads its specific amino acid onto its PCP-domain.
- Condensation: The C-domain catalyzes the amide bond formation between the thioester group of the growing peptide chain from the previous module with the amino group of the current module. The extended peptide is now attached to the current PCP-domain.
- Condensation-Cyclization: Sometimes the C-domain is replaced by a Cy-domain, which, in addition to the amide bond formation, catalyzes the reaction of the serine, threonine, or cysteine sidechain with the amide-N, thereby forming oxazolidines and thiazolidine, respectively.
- Epimerization: Sometimes an E-domain epimerizes the innermost amino acid of the peptide chain into the D-configuration.
- This cycle is repeated for each elongation module.

=== Termination stage ===
- Termination: The TE-domain (thio-esterase domain) hydrolyzes the completed polypeptide chain from the PCP-domain of the previous module, thereby often forming cyclic amides (lactams) or cyclic esters (lactones).
- Also, the peptide can be released by an R-domain that reduces the thioester bond to terminal aldehyde or alcohol.

=== Processing ===
The final peptide is often modified, e.g., by glycosylation, acylation, halogenation, or hydroxylation. The responsible enzymes are usually associated to the synthetase complex and their genes are organized in the same operons or gene clusters.

=== Priming and deblocking ===
To become functional, the 4'-phospho-pantetheine sidechain of acyl-CoA molecules has to be attached to the PCP-domain by 4'PP transferases (Priming) and the S-attached acyl group has to be removed by specialized associated thioesterases (TE-II) (Deblocking).

=== Substrate specificities ===
Most domains have a very broad substrate specificity and usually only the A-domain determines which amino acid is incorporated in a module. Ten amino acids that control substrate specificity and can be considered the 'codons' of nonribosomal peptide synthesis have been identified, and rational protein design has yielded methodologies to computationally switch the specificities of A-domains. The condensation C-domain is also believed to have substrate specificity, especially if located behind an epimerase E-domain-containing module where it functions as a 'filter' for the epimerized isomer. Computational methods, such as SANDPUMA and NRPSpredictor2, have been developed to predict substrate specificity from DNA or protein sequence data.

=== Mixed with polyketides ===
Due to the similarity with polyketide synthases (PKS), many secondary metabolites are, in fact, fusions of NRPs and polyketides. In essence, this occurs when PK modules follow NRP modules, and vice versa. This is possible because the carrier domains (PCP/ACP) are quite similar between each other and they use a similar "chain-flipping" action to access the growing substrate.

Although there is high degree of similarity between the Carrier (PCP/ACP) domains of both types of synthetases, the mechanism of condensation is different from a chemical standpoint:

- PKS, carbon-carbon bond formation through Claisen condensation reaction
- NRPs, the C domain catalyzes the amide bond formation between the amino acid it adds to the chain (on the PCP of one module) and the nascent peptide (on the PCP of the next module).

== See also ==
- Epothilone
- Esterase
- Ribosomally synthesized and post-translationally modified peptides
