= Zwittermicin A =

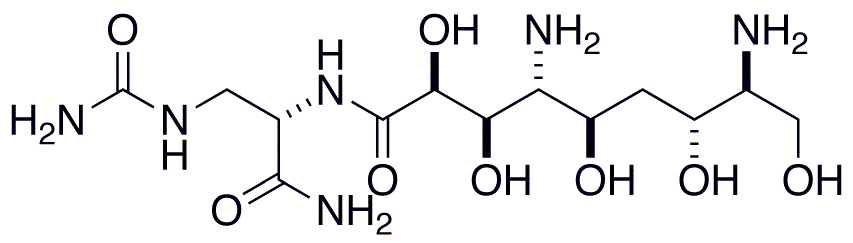

Names
- Systematic IUPAC name (2S,3R,4R,5R,7R,8S)-4,8-Diamino-N-[(2S)-1-amino-3-(carbamoylamino)-1-oxopropan-2-yl]-2,3,5,7,9-pentahydroxynonanamide

Identifiers
CAS Number	155547-95-8
3D model (JSmol)	Interactive image
ChEBI	CHEBI:80056
ChEMBL	ChEMBL1093072
ChemSpider	24669086
KEGG	C15726
PubChem CID	44474866
UNII	J5KML2XGC6
- InChI: InChI=1S/C13H28N6O8/c14-4(3-20)6(21)1-7(22)8(15)9(23)10(24)12(26)19-5(11(16)25)2-18-13(17)27/h4-10,20-24H,1-3,14-15H2,(H2,16,25)(H,19,26)(H3,17,18,27)/t4-,5-,6+,7+,8+,9+,10-/m0/s1 Key: FYIPKJHNWFVEIR-VTAUKWRXSA-N; InChI=1/C13H28N6O8/c14-4(3-20)6(21)1-7(22)8(15)9(23)10(24)12(26)19-5(11(16)25)2-18-13(17)27/h4-10,20-24H,1-3,14-15H2,(H2,16,25)(H,19,26)(H3,17,18,27)/t4-,5-,6+,7+,8+,9+,10-/m0/s1 Key: FYIPKJHNWFVEIR-VTAUKWRXBI
- SMILES: C([C@H]([C@H](CO)N)O)[C@H]([C@H]([C@H]([C@@H](C(=O)N[C@@H](CNC(=O)N)C(=O)N)O)O)N)O

Properties
Chemical formula	C_{13}H_{28}N_{6}O_{8}
Molar mass	396.396820
- Except where otherwise noted, data are given for materials in their standard state (at 25 °C [77 °F], 100 kPa). verify (what is ?) Infobox references

Zwittermicin A is an antibiotic that has been identified from the bacterium Bacillus cereus UW85. It is a molecule of interest to agricultural industry because it has the potential to suppress plant disease due to its broad spectrum activity against certain gram positive and gram negative prokaryotic micro-organisms. The molecule is also of interest from a metabolic perspective because it represents a new structural class of antibiotic and suggests a crossover between polyketide and non-ribosomal peptide biosynthetic pathways. Zwittermicin A is linear aminopolyol.

== Biosynthesis ==
Zwittermycin A biosynthesis is a hybrid of polyketide and non-ribosomal peptide synthetic pathways. Most likely, all of the synthases are located on one megasynthase much like a type I fatty acid synthase. Based on mutant studies, the biosynthetic cluster involved in zwittermicin production has been identified and the pathway has been proposed. The genes responsible for the production of zwittermicin A are located on a 16 kb cluster containing nine orfs and a self resistant gene zmaR, a gene that encodes an acylation enzyme that deactivate zwittermicin A. The hybrid synthase used in zwittermicin A production utilizes modified extender units such as hydroxymalonyl-ACP, aminomalonyl-ACP and 2,3-diaminopropionate. Therefore, many of the genes in the biosynthetic cluster encode for enzymes responsible for the synthesis of these extender units used in the hybrid synthase. For example, orf5 encodes ZWA5A, an enzyme that is responsible for the PLP mediated amination that converts L-serine to 2,3-diaminopropionate. It has also been shown that orf5, orf7, orf4 and orf6 participate in the biosynthesis of aminomalonyl-ACP and orf3, orf2 and orf1 synthesize hydroxymalonyl-ACP.

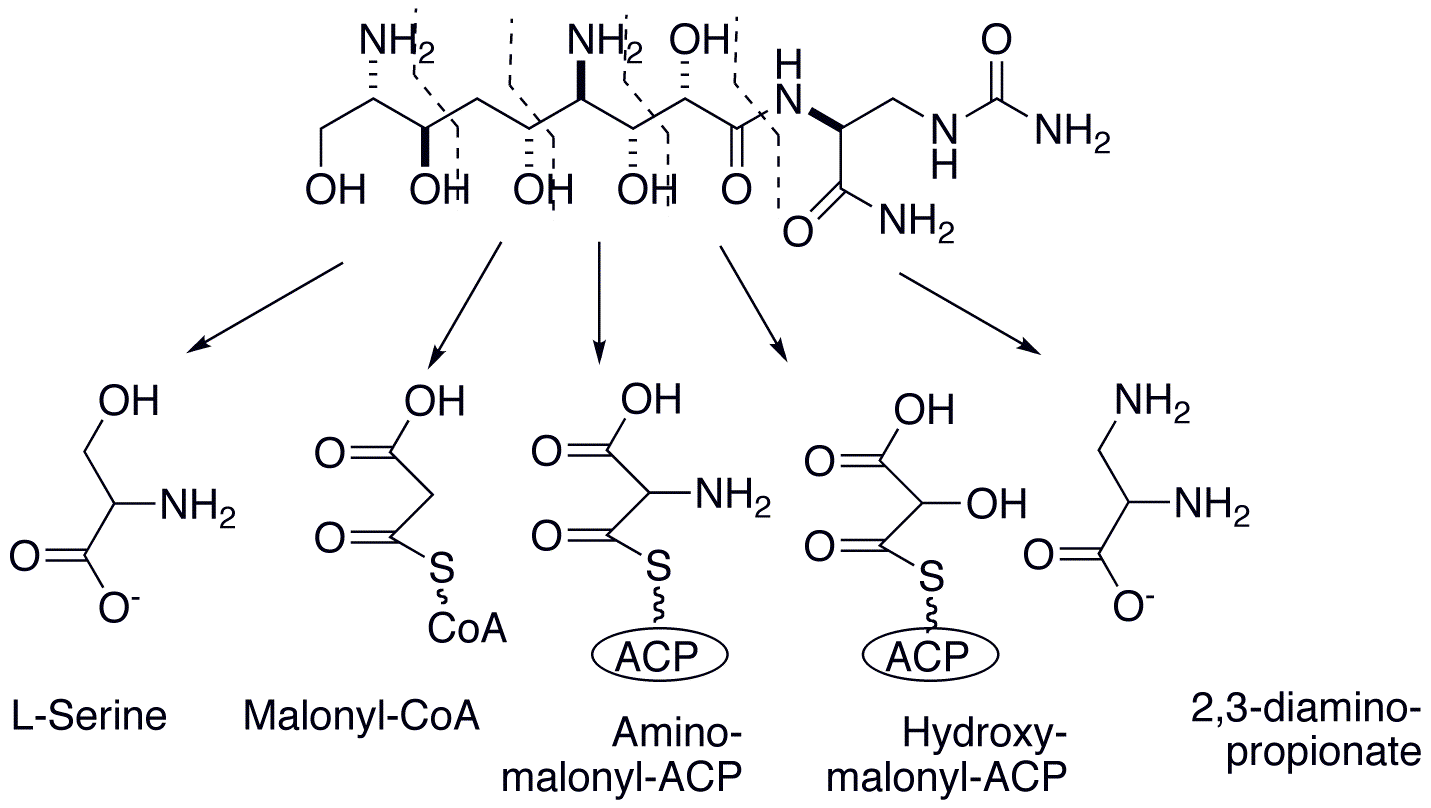
Units used in Zwittermicin A Production

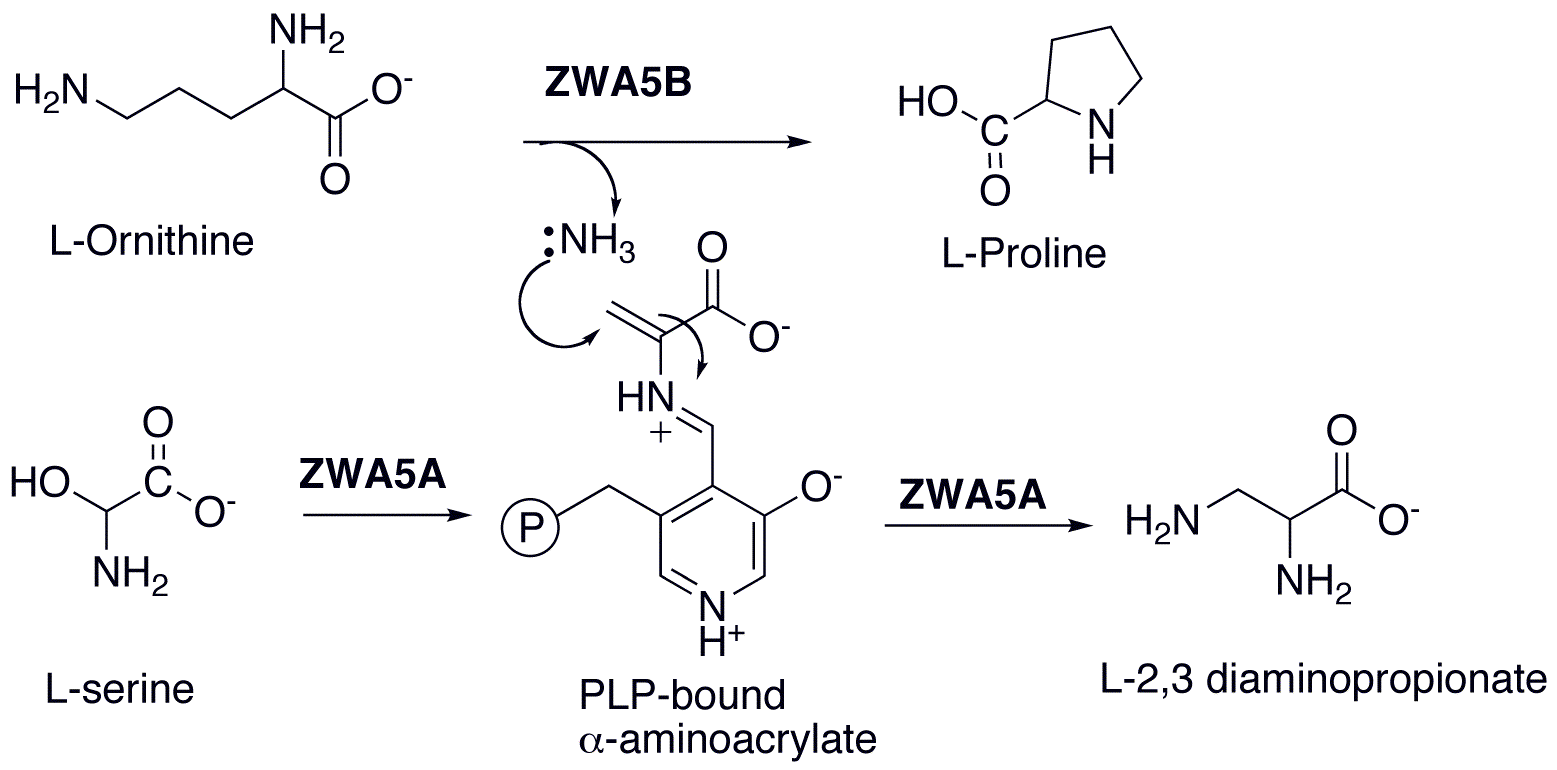
Biosynthesis of L-2,3 Diaminopropionate

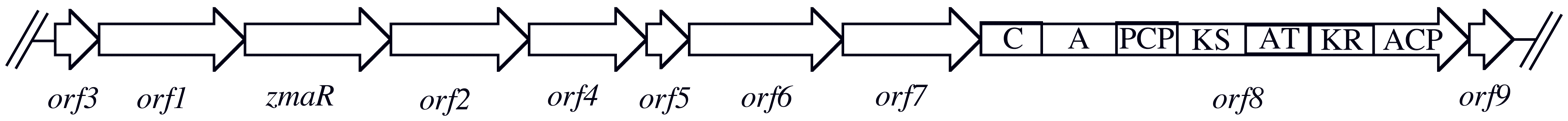
Gene organization of the Zwittermicin A biosynthetic cluster.

Gene organization of the Zwittermicin A biosynthetic cluster.

Genes encoding for the seven component hybrid synthase responsible for the assembly of the backbone is likely located on the largest gene, orf8. Assembly begins by the activation of a serine residue. This is done by tethering the amino acid to a peptidal carrier protein via a non-ribosomal peptide synthetase. Subsequently elongation of an activated malonyl unit covalently attached to an acyl carrier protein by a ketosynthase occurs giving the five carbon unit. The next two elongation steps proceed in a similar manner using aminomalonyl and hydroxymalonyl units from a second and third ketosynthase. Finally, condensation of 2,3-diaminopropionate with the carried molecule by a second nonribosomalpeptide synthase produces the zwittermicin A backbone. Attack of ammonia via an amidotransferase enzyme releases the carrier protein. The last step involves a carbomyltransferase enzyme that carbamolates the released molecule giving the final product.

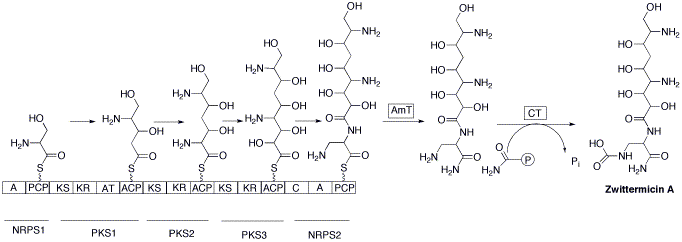
Zwittermicin A Biosynthesis
