= René Dubos =

French-American microbiologist

René Jules Dubos
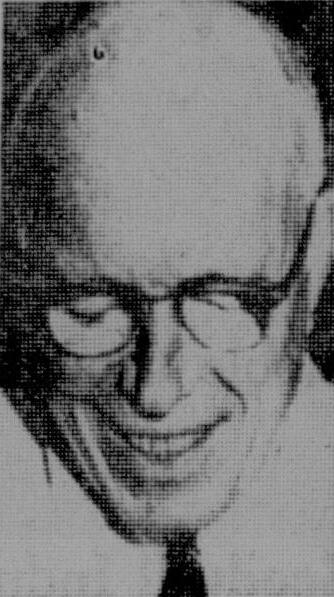
- Dubos in 1969
- Born: 20 February 1901; Saint-Brice-sous-Forêt, France
- Died: 20 February 1982 (aged 81); New York, New York, U.S.
- Citizenship: French, American
- Education: Rutgers University
- Known for: Isolation and first successful testing of natural antibiotics Coining the phrase "Think globally, act locally"
- Awards: E. Mead Johnson Award (1941); Albert Lasker Award for Basic Medical Research (1948); Pulitzer Prize for General Nonfiction (1969); Cullum Geographical Medal (1975); Tyler Prize for Environmental Achievement (1976)
- Scientific career
- Fields: Microbiology
- Workplaces: The Rockefeller University (formerly The Rockefeller Institute for Medical Research)

René Jules Dubos (February 20, 1901 – February 20, 1982) was a French-American microbiologist, experimental pathologist, environmentalist, humanist, and winner of the Pulitzer Prize for General Nonfiction for his book So Human An Animal. He is credited for having made famous the environmental maxim: "Think globally, act locally." Aside from a period from 1942 to 1944 when he was George Fabyan Professor of Comparative Pathology and professor of tropical medicine at Harvard Medical School and Harvard School of Public Health, his scientific career was spent entirely at The Rockefeller Institute for Medical Research, later renamed The Rockefeller University.

== Early life and education ==
Dubos was born in Saint-Brice-sous-Forêt, France, on February 20, 1901, and grew up in Hénonville, another small Île-de-France farming village north of Paris. His parents operated butcher shops in each of these villages. He attended high school and the National Institute of Agronomy in Paris, and he received a Ph.D. from Rutgers University in 1927.

== Career ==
Dubos began his career in microbiology in 1927, when he joined Oswald Avery's laboratory at The Rockefeller Institute for Medical Research. Avery was looking for a microbe that could break down the polysaccharide capsule of a deadly strain of bacterial pneumonia in the same way that soil bacteria digested decaying organic matter in the woods. Dubos identified a bacterium that secreted an enzyme that broke down polysaccharide. In 1939, with the help of Rockefeller Institute biochemist Rollin Hotchkiss, Dubos isolated the antibacterial agents tyrothricin and gramicidin from the bacterium Bacillus brevis that killed or inhibited Gram-positive bacteria and tested their bacterial, chemical, and clinical properties. These antibiotics remain in limited use today. In 1942, before antibiotics were in general use, Dubos warned that bacterial resistance should be expected.

Dubos devoted most of his professional life to the empirical study of microbial diseases and to the analysis of the environmental and social factors that affect the welfare of humans. His pioneering research in isolating antibacterial substances from certain soil microorganisms led to the discovery of major antibiotics. He performed groundbreaking research and wrote extensively on a number of subjects, including tuberculosis, pneumonia, and the mechanisms of acquired immunity, natural susceptibility, and resistance to infection.

In 1948, Dubos shared the Albert Lasker Basic Medical Research Award with Selman Waksman for "their achievement in studies of the antibiotic properties of soil bacteria". He was elected to the American Philosophical Society in 1954 and the American Academy of Arts and Sciences in 1960. A member of the National Academy of Sciences, he served as an editor of the Journal of Experimental Medicine from 1946 to 1972.

In later years, Dubos explored the interplay of environmental forces and the physical, mental and spiritual development of mankind. The main tenets of his humanistic philosophy were: global problems are conditioned by local circumstances and choices, social evolution enables us to rethink human actions and change direction to promote an ecologically balanced environment, the future is optimistic since human life and nature are resilient and we have become increasingly aware of the dangers inherent in natural forces and human activities, and we can benefit from our successes and apply the lessons learned to solving other contemporary environmental problems.

For the academic years 1963–1964 and 1964–1965, he was a Fellow at the Center for Advanced Studies of Wesleyan University. He served as chairman of the trustees of the René Dubos Center for Human Environment, a non-profit education and research organization that was dedicated in his honor in 1980. The mission of the center, which was co-founded by William and Ruth Eblen, is to "assist the general public and decision-makers in formulating policies for the resolution of environmental problems and the creation of environmental values." Dubos remained actively involved with the Center until his death in 1982. He also served on the board of trustees of Science Service, now known as Society for Science & the Public, from 1949 to 1952.

=== Think Globally, Act Locally ===
Dubos is often attributed as the author of the popular maxim "Think Globally, Act Locally" that refers to the argument that global environmental problems can turn into action only by considering ecological, economic, and cultural differences of our local surroundings. This motto appeared for the first time in 1977, five years after Dubos served as advisor to the 1972 United Nations Conference on the Human Environment. In 1979, Dubos suggested that ecological consciousness should begin at home. He urged creation of a world order in which "natural and social units maintain or recapture their identity, yet interplay with each other through a rich system of communications". In the 1980s, Dubos held to his thoughts on acting locally, and felt that issues involving the environment must be dealt with in their "unique physical, climatic, and cultural contexts". Dubos's approach to building a resilient and constructive relationship between people and the Earth continues to resonate.

== Death ==
He died February 20, 1982, his 81st birthday, due to heart failure. He was survived by his wife, Jean Porter Dubos, who died in 1988.

== Legacy ==
- In 1998, the René Dubos Center for Human Environments donated a large portion of its environmental library and archives to Pace University. The collection consists of works by Dubos as well as those of other leading environmental scholars, some of which have been annotated by Dubos himself. According to Robert Chapman, professor of philosophy and coordinator of Pace's Environmental Studies Program, "Pace now has many of Dubos's own research books from the Rockefeller University, and this means that we can not only look at his writing, but we can also do an analysis of where his ideas come from and what influenced him."
- In 1979, the René Dubos Center purchased 30 acres (120,000 m^{2}) of land in North Castle, New York, with donations from foundations. As a condition of the purchase it agreed to keep the property in a natural state. Nevertheless, in 2002 it attempted to sell the land to developer Michael Cappelli, who planned to develop luxury homes there. The Center filed legal action in 2007 to attempt to complete this transaction; however, New York Attorney General Andrew Cuomo opposed the move, and the State Supreme Court ruled against the Center in that year. In 2009, the controversy was resolved when the Center agreed to sell the land to the village of Mount Kisco, New York.

== Awards and honors ==
- Recipient of the International Center in New York's Award of Excellence.
- Winner of Pulitzer Prize for General Nonfiction for So Human An Animal in 1969

== Books ==
- The Bacterial Cell in its Relation to Problems of Virulence, Immunity and Chemotherapy, 1945, Harvard University Press
- Louis Pasteur, Free Lance of Science, 1950, 1960, Charles Scribner's Sons, Da Capo Press 1986 reprint of 1960 edition: ISBN 0-306-80262-7
- The White Plague: Tuberculosis, Man, and Society, 1952, Little, Brown, and Company, Rutgers University Press 1987: ISBN 0-8135-1224-7
- Biochemical Determinants of Microbial Diseases, 1954, Harvard University Press
- Man, Medicine, and Environment, 1968, Praeger
- Mirage of Health: Utopias, Progress & Biological Change, 1959, Rutgers University Press 1987: ISBN 0-8135-1260-3
- Pasteur and Modern Science, 1960, Anchor Books, American Society of Microbiology edition with new chapter by Thomas D. Brock, 1998: ISBN 1-55581-144-2
- The Dreams of Reason: Science and Utopias, 1961 George B. Pegram lectures, Columbia University Press
- The Unseen World, 1962, The Rockefeller Institute Press
- The Torch of Life: Continuity in Living Experience, 1962, Simon and Schuster, Touchstone 1970 reprint: ISBN 0-671-20469-6
- Man Adapting, 1966, Yale University Press, ISBN 0-300-00437-0, enlarged edition 1980: ISBN 0-300-02581-5
- So Human an Animal: How We Are Shaped by Surroundings and Events, 1968, Scribner Book Company, Transaction Publishers 1998 edition: ISBN 0-7658-0429-8 (won the 1969 Pulitzer Prize for nonfiction)
- Reason Awake, 1970, Columbia University Press, ISBN 0-231-03181-5
- Only One Earth: The Care and Maintenance of a Small Planet, 1972, coauthored with Barbara Ward and United Nations Conference on the Human Environment, W W Norton & Co, ISBN 0-393-06391-7
- A God Within, 1973, Scribner, ISBN 0-684-13506-X
- Of Human Diversity, 1974, Clark University Press, ISBN 0-914206-24-9
- Beast or Angel: Choices That Make Us Human, 1974, Scribner, hardcover: ISBN 0-684-17608-4, paperback 1984: ISBN 0-684-14436-0
- The Professor, the Institute, and DNA: Oswald T. Avery, His Life and Scientific Achievements, 1976, Paul & Company, ISBN 0-87470-022-1
- The Wooing of Earth, 1980, Scribner, ISBN 0-684-16501-5
- Quest: Reflections on Medicine, Science, and Humanity, 1980, Harcourt Brace Jovanovich, ISBN 0-15-175705-4
- Celebrations of Life, 1981, McGraw Hill, ISBN 0-07-017893-3
- The World of René Dubos: A Collection from His Writings, 1990, Henry Holt & Co, ISBN 0-8050-1360-1

=== As editor ===
- LIFE Science Library, including authorship of one of its 26 volumes: Health and Disease (1965), with Maya Pines
