= Viomycin =

Chemical compound

Clinical data
- Routes of administration: Intramuscular injection
- Drug class: Aminoglycoside
- ATC code: None

Legal status
- Legal status: US: ℞-only

Identifiers
- IUPAC name: (S)-3,6-Diamino-N-((3S,9S,12S,15S,Z)-((2R,4S)-6-amino-4-hydroxy-1,2,3,4-tetrahydropyridin-2-yl)-9,12-bis(hydroxymethyl)2,5,8,11,14-pentaoxo-6-(ureidomethylene)-1,4,7,10,13-pentaazacyclohexadecan-15-yl)hexanamide
- CAS Number: 32988-50-4; 37883-00-4
- PubChem CID: 3037981
- DrugBank: DB06827; DBSALT000952
- ChemSpider: 2301596; 4445631
- UNII: YVU35998K5; LKO141R05V
- KEGG: D02270
- ChEBI: CHEBI:15782
- ChEMBL: ChEMBL1201221; ChEMBL3989823
- CompTox Dashboard (EPA): DTXSID0023741
- ECHA InfoCard: 100.046.643

Chemical and physical data
- Formula: C_{25}H_{43}N_{13}O_{10}
- Molar mass: 685.700 g·mol^{−1}
- 3D model (JSmol): Interactive image
- SMILES: C1[C@@H](NC(=N[C@H]1O)N)[C@H]2C(=O)NC[C@@H](C(=O)N[C@H](C(=O)N[C@H](C(=O)N/C(=C\NC(=O)N)/C(=O)N2)CO)CO)NC(=O)C[C@H](CCCN)N
- InChI: InChI=1S/C25H43N13O10/c26-3-1-2-10(27)4-16(41)32-12-6-30-23(47)18(11-5-17(42)37-24(28)36-11)38-20(44)13(7-31-25(29)48)33-21(45)14(8-39)35-22(46)15(9-40)34-19(12)43/h7,10-12,14-15,17-18,39-40,42H,1-6,8-9,26-27H2,(H,30,47)(H,32,41)(H,33,45)(H,34,43)(H,35,46)(H,38,44)(H3,28,36,37)(H3,29,31,48)/b13-7-/t10-,11+,12-,14-,15-,17-,18-/m0/s1; Key:GXFAIFRPOKBQRV-GHXCTMGLSA-N; Key:AQONYROJHRNYQQ-QMAPKBLTSA-N

Viomycin is a member of the tuberactinomycin family, a group of nonribosomal peptide antibiotics exhibiting anti-tuberculosis activity. The tuberactinomycin family is an essential component in the drug cocktail currently used to fight infections of Mycobacterium tuberculosis. Viomycin was the first member of the tuberactinomycins to be isolated and identified, and was used to treat TB until it was replaced by the less toxic, but structurally related compound, capreomycin. The tuberactinomycins target bacterial ribosomes, binding RNA and disrupting bacterial protein synthesis and certain forms of RNA splicing. Viomycin is produced by the actinomycete Streptomyces puniceus.

== Biosynthesis ==
The gene cluster for viomycin has been sequenced from Streptomyces sp. strain ATCC 11861, Streptomyces vinaceus and from Streptomyces lividans 1326. It consists of a central cyclic pentapeptide code assembled from nonribosomal peptide synthetase (NRPS). The NRPS contains 4 proteins: VioA, VioF, VioI, and VioG. These proteins condense and cyclize two molecules of L-2,3-diaminopropionate (L-Dap), two molecules of L-serine (L-Ser), and one molecule of (2S,3R)-capreomycidine (L-Cam). After cyclizing these, VioJ catalyzes the α,β-desaturation of this preliminary structure. It is proposed that the viomycin gene cluster includes 36.3 kb of contiguous DNA that encodes 20 open reading frames (ORFs) that are involved in the biosynthesis, regulation, and eventual activation viomycin. In addition to these ORFs, the structure contains the resistance gene vph. The following is a summary of the ORFs and their functions.

- VioA: NRPS (A-PCP-C-A-PCP-C)
- VioH: Type II thioesterase
- VioO: NRPS (A-PCP)-β-lysine activation
- VioB: 2,3-diaminopropionate synthase
- VioI: NRPS (PCP-C)
- VioP: Lysine 2,3-aminomutase
- VioC: L-Arg hydroxylase
- VIoJ: 2,3-diaminopropionyl α,β-desaturase
- vph: Viomycin phosphotransferase
- VioD: Capreomycidine synthase
- VioK: Ornithine cyclodeaminase
- VioQ: Capreomycidine hydroxylase
- VioE: Permease
- VioL: Carbamoyltransferase
- VioR: Transcriptional regulator
- VioF: NRPS (A-PCP-C)
- VIoM: NRPS (C)-β-lysine transferase
- VIoS: Viomycin-phosphate phosphatase
- VioG: NRPS (A-PCP-C/)
- VioN: MbtH homolog
- VioT: Transcriptional regulator

=== Synthesis of the backbone ===
The following is the proposed biosynthesis of viomycin using NRPS-catalyzed peptide synthesis. There are five modules for cyclic pentapeptide biosynthesis, including one that lacks an adenylation domain (A). It is therefore proposed that one of the other A domains functions twice. Additionally, the NRPS subunits are not suspected to function in the order in which their genes are arranged, a characteristic of viomycin biosynthesis that is unlike typical NRPS-catalyzed peptide synthesis. The NRPS components function in the order of VioA→VioI→VioF→VioG to account for the incorporation of β-ureidoalanine (β-Uda). The first A domain of VioA creates an L-Dap-PCP intermediate on the first PCP domain. Meanwhile, the second A domain of VioA loads L-Ser onto the second PCP domain, as well as the PCP of VioI. The activation of β-Uda occurs via VioF, and VioG incorporates L-Cam.

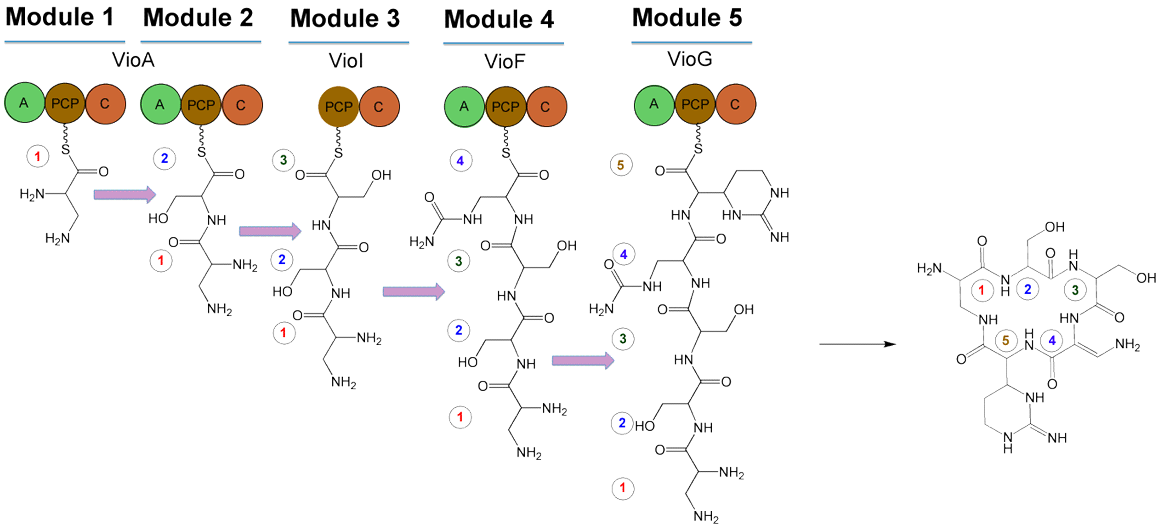
Figure 1. Domain Organization of viomycin.

=== Post-modification ===
After α,β-desaturation via VioJ, three modifications to the preliminary cyclic structure occur. Hydroxylation of C-6 in the structure occurs by VioQ, N-acylation of α-amino group using β-lysine, VioO, and VioM, and carbamoylation of the β-amino group, producing β-ureidoalanine (β-Uda) by the carbamoyltransferase homologue VioL.

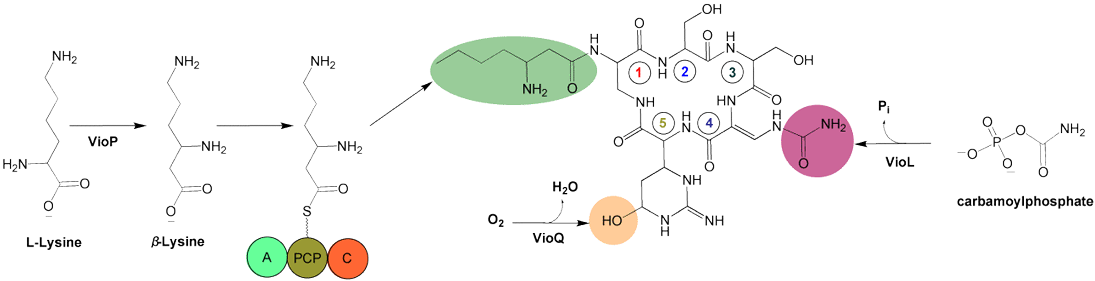
Figure 2. Post-modification of Viomycin.
