= Condensation domain =

Condensation
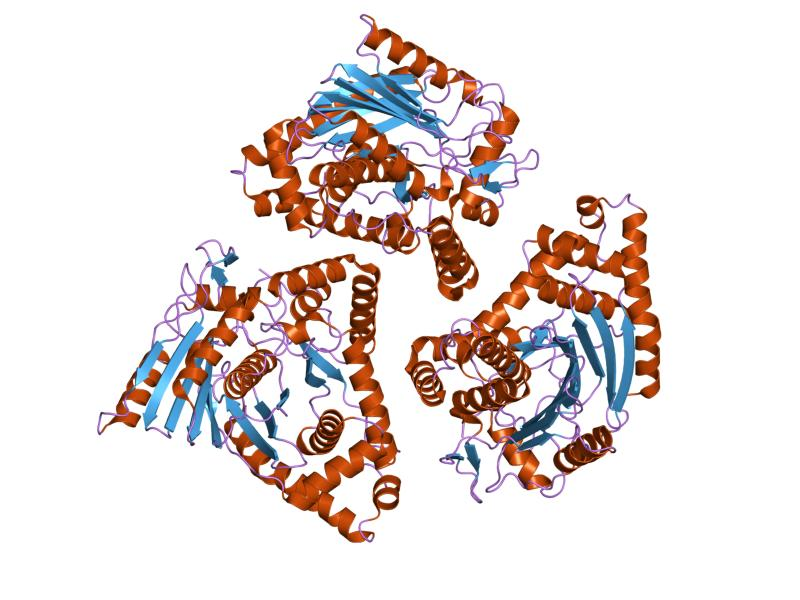
- crystal structure of vibh, an nrps condensation enzyme

Identifiers
- Symbol: Condensation
- Pfam: PF00668
- Pfam clan: CL0149
- InterPro: IPR001242
- SCOP2: 1l5a / SCOPe / SUPFAM
Available protein structures:
- PDB: IPR001242 PF00668 (ECOD; PDBsum)
- AlphaFold: IPR001242; PF00668

In molecular biology, the condensation domain is a protein domain found in many multi-domain enzymes which synthesise peptide antibiotics. This domain catalyses a condensation reaction to form peptide bonds in non-ribosomal peptide biosynthesis. It is usually found to the carboxy side of a phosphopantetheine binding domain (pp-binding). It has been shown that mutations in the HHXXXDG sequence motif in this domain abolish activity suggesting this is part of the active site.
