= Brevibacillus brevis =

Scientific classification
- Domain: Bacteria
- Kingdom: Bacillati
- Phylum: Bacillota
- Class: Bacilli
- Order: Caryophanales
- Family: Brevibacillaceae
- Genus: Brevibacillus
- Species: B. brevis

Binomial name
- Brevibacillus brevis (Migula 1900) Shida et al. 1996

Type strain
- ATCC 8246; BCRC 14682; CCM 2050; CCRC 14682; CCUG 7413; CIP 52.86; DSM 30; HAMBI 1883; IFO 15304; JCM 2503; LMG 7123; NBIMCC 2211; NBRC 15304; NCCB 48009; NCIB 9372; NCIMB 9372; NCTC 2611; NRRL B-14602; NRRL NRS-604; VKM B-503

Synonyms
- Bacillus brevis Migula 1900

Species of bacterium

Brevibacillus brevis (formerly known as Bacillus brevis) is a Gram-positive, aerobic, motile, spore-forming, rod-shaped bacterium commonly found in soil, air, water, and decaying matter. It is rarely associated with infectious diseases. The antibiotics gramicidin and tyrocidine were first isolated from it.

Brevibacillus brevis is catalase positive, amylase negative, casein negative, gelatinase positive, and indole negative; most strains are citrate users. Some strains are capable of oxidizing carbon monoxide aerobically. Optimal growth occurs at 35 °C to 55 °C.
