= Oxalate degrading enzyme =

Type of enzyme

The oxalate anion is equivalent to two molecules of carbon dioxide to which two electrons have been added. Removal of these electrons in a redox reaction may permit liberation of carbon dioxide.

An oxalate degrading enzyme is a type of enzyme that catalyzes the biodegradation of oxalate. Enzymes in this class include oxalate oxidase, oxalate decarboxylase, oxalyl-CoA decarboxylase, and formyl-CoA transferase.

== Enzymes ==
Oxalate oxidase (Enzyme Commission number EC 1.2.3.4) occurs mainly in plants. It can degrade oxalic acid into carbon dioxide and hydrogen peroxide.

Oxalate decarboxylase (OXDC, EC 4.1.1.2) is a kind of oxalate degrading enzyme containing Mn^{2+}, found mainly in fungi or some bacteria. Brown rot fungi secrete oxalate to break down cellulose fibers of wood, but deploy this enzyme to permit regulatory control over the total quantity of oxalate present. It can appear in the absence of other cofactors under the action of the degradation of oxalic acid directly to form formic acid and CO_{2}.

Oxalyl-CoA decarboxylase (EC 4.1.1.8) mainly mediates degradation of bacterial oxalic acid.

Formyl-CoA transferase (EC 2.8.3.16) mediates the exchange of oxalyl and formyl groups on coenzyme A, interconverting formyl-CoA and oxalyl-CoA.

== Relevance to kidney stone disease ==
Oxalic acid salts, in particular calcium oxalate, are the main component of the most common type of kidney stone in humans. Though kidney stones have been known to human cultures around the world for thousands of years, this relationship between oxalate metabolism and stone formation came to mainstream medical awareness beginning around 1970. Since then, various methods of reducing oxalate-associated stone formation have arisen in clinical nephrology including low oxalate diets, increased water consumption (which dilutes urine and reduces stone growth), increasing consumption of acidic foods or liquids, and most recently commensal gut microbes which metabolize oxalates directly. The awareness of microbial oxalate degradation in animal GI tracts in fact predates even the discovery of oxalate-associated kidney stone disease altogether, having been identified directly in ruminants in 1955.

The first microbial taxa identified in this context is the genus Oxalobacter, a chemorganootrophic clade which uses oxalate as a primary carbon source. Oxalobacter species are more abundant in populations without access to antibiotics and in particular modern Hunter-gatherers such as the Hadza in Tanzania, compared to urbanized sedentary populations. Gut colonization by O. formigenes has been widely studied and is consistently negatively correlated with kidney stone incidence. Importantly, about one-third to half of oxalate in human circulation is produced endogenously from the degradation of ascorbic acid, commonly known as vitamin C, which suggests that other metabolic health factors likely mediate the relationship between relative oxalate intake and stone formation.
