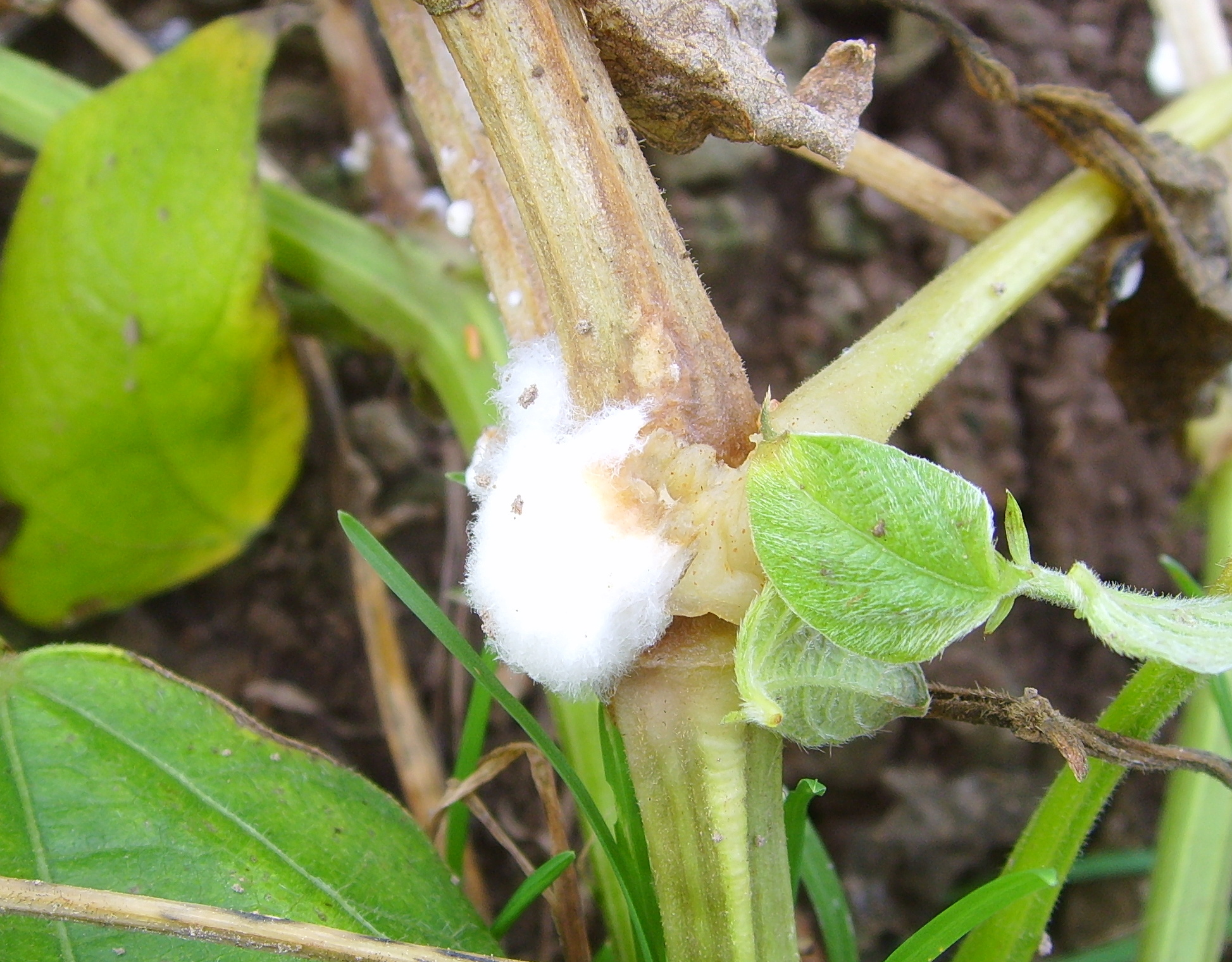
- Sclerotinia sclerotiorum on Phaseolus

Scientific classification
- Kingdom: Fungi
- Division: Ascomycota
- Class: Leotiomycetes
- Order: Helotiales
- Family: Sclerotiniaceae
- Genus: Sclerotinia
- Species: S. sclerotiorum

Binomial name
- Sclerotinia sclerotiorum (Lib.) de Bary (1884)

Synonyms
- Hymenoscyphus sclerotiorum (Lib.) W.Phillips (1887); Peziza sclerotiorum Lib. (1837); Sclerotinia libertiana Fuckel (1870); Sclerotium varium Pers. (1801); Whetzelinia sclerotiorum (Lib.) Korf & Dumont (1972)

= Sclerotinia sclerotiorum =

Species of fungus

Sclerotinia sclerotiorum is a plant pathogenic fungus and can cause a disease called white mold if conditions are conducive. S. sclerotiorum can also be known as cottony rot, watery soft rot, stem rot, drop, crown rot and blossom blight. A key characteristic of this pathogen is its ability to produce black resting structures known as sclerotia and white fuzzy growths of mycelium on the plant it infects. These sclerotia give rise to a fruiting body in the spring that produces spores in a sac which is why fungi in this class are called sac fungi (Ascomycota). This pathogen can occur on many continents and has a wide host range of plants. When S. sclerotiorum is onset in the field by favorable environmental conditions, losses can be great and control measures should be considered.

== Hosts and symptoms ==
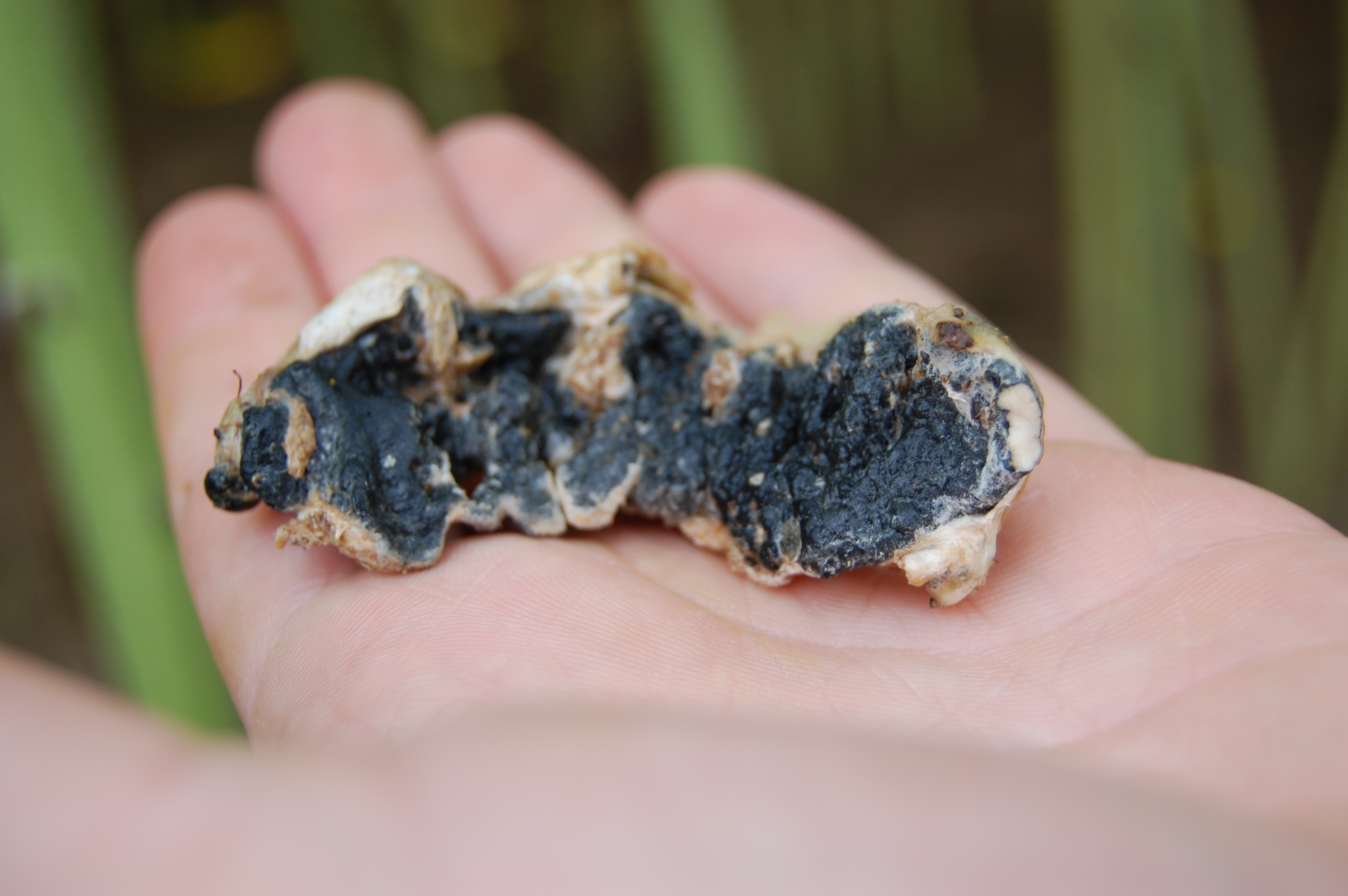
Sclerotia from sunflower

Sclerotinia sclerotiorum (sometimes called white mold) is a fungal (Ascomycota) pathogen that infects a broad range of plants, affecting over 400 species across multiple families, including Brassicaceae (Cruciferae), Fabaceae (Leguminosae), Solanaceae, Asteraceae, and Apiaceae (Umbelliferae). Notably it is not known to infect grass species, and appears to be incapable of causing disease in clover. Common hosts of white mold are herbaceous, succulent plants, particularly flowers and vegetables. Sunflowers are common hosts for white mold. It can also affect woody ornamentals occasionally, usually on juvenile tissue. White mold can affect their hosts at any stage of growth, including seedlings, mature plants, and harvested products. It can usually be found on tissues with high water content and in close proximity to the soil. One of the first symptoms noticed is an obvious area of white, fluffy mycelial growth. Usually this is preceded by pale to dark brown lesions on the stem at the soil line. The mycelium then cover this necrotic area. Once the xylem is affected, other symptoms occur higher up in the plant. These can include chlorosis, wilting, leaf drop, and death quickly follows. On fruits, the initial dark lesions occur on the tissue that comes in contact with the soil. Next, white fungal mycelium covers the fruit and it decays. This can occur when the fruit is in the field or when in storage.

== Importance ==
White mold affects a wide range of hosts and causes sclerotinia stem rot. It is known to infect 408 plant species. As a nonspecific plant pathogen, diverse host range and ability to infect plants at any stage of growth makes white mold a serious disease. The fungus can survive on infected tissues, in the soil, and on living plants. It affects young seedlings, mature plants, and fruit in the field or in storage. White mold can spread quickly in the field from plant to plant. It can also spread in a storage facility throughout the harvested crop. Some crops it affects commonly are soybeans, green beans, sunflowers, canola, and peanuts. White mold is the most common pathogen that affects sunflower and has been found to cause reduction in yield throughout the world including the United States, northern Europe, Great Britain and Russia. Economically significant hosts include Vicia faba, for which Lithourgidis et al. have done extensive work over the years.

Sclerotinia stem rot (or 'white stem rot', ) can cause economically significant yield losses in temperate climates, especially during cool and moist growing seasons. An analysis of soybean yields from 1996 to 2009 in the United States found that sclerotinia stem rot reduced yields by over ten million bushels in half of the studied growing seasons. During particularly bad years, these soybean yield reductions caused producers to lose millions of dollars. Compared to 23 common soybean diseases, sclerotinia stem rot was the second most problematic disease in the United States from 1996 to 2009. For soybeans, crop yields are inversely correlated with the incidence of Sclerotinia stem rot; an estimated 0.25 metric ton per ha is lost for each 10% increment of diseased plants.

== Environment ==
The pathogenic fungus Sclerotinia sclerotiorum proliferates in moist and cool environments. Under moist field conditions, S. sclerotiorum is capable of completely invading a plant host, colonizing nearly all of the plant's tissues with mycelium. Optimal temperatures for growth range from 15 to 21 degrees Celsius. Under wet conditions, S. sclerotiorum will produce an abundance of mycelium and sclerotia. Like most fungi, S. sclerotiorum prefers darker, shadier conditions as opposed to direct exposure to sunlight. For soybeans specifically, optimal conditions include canopy temperatures less than 28 °C and plant surface wetness for 12–16 h on a daily basis or continuous surface wetness for 42–72 h.

== Life cycle ==
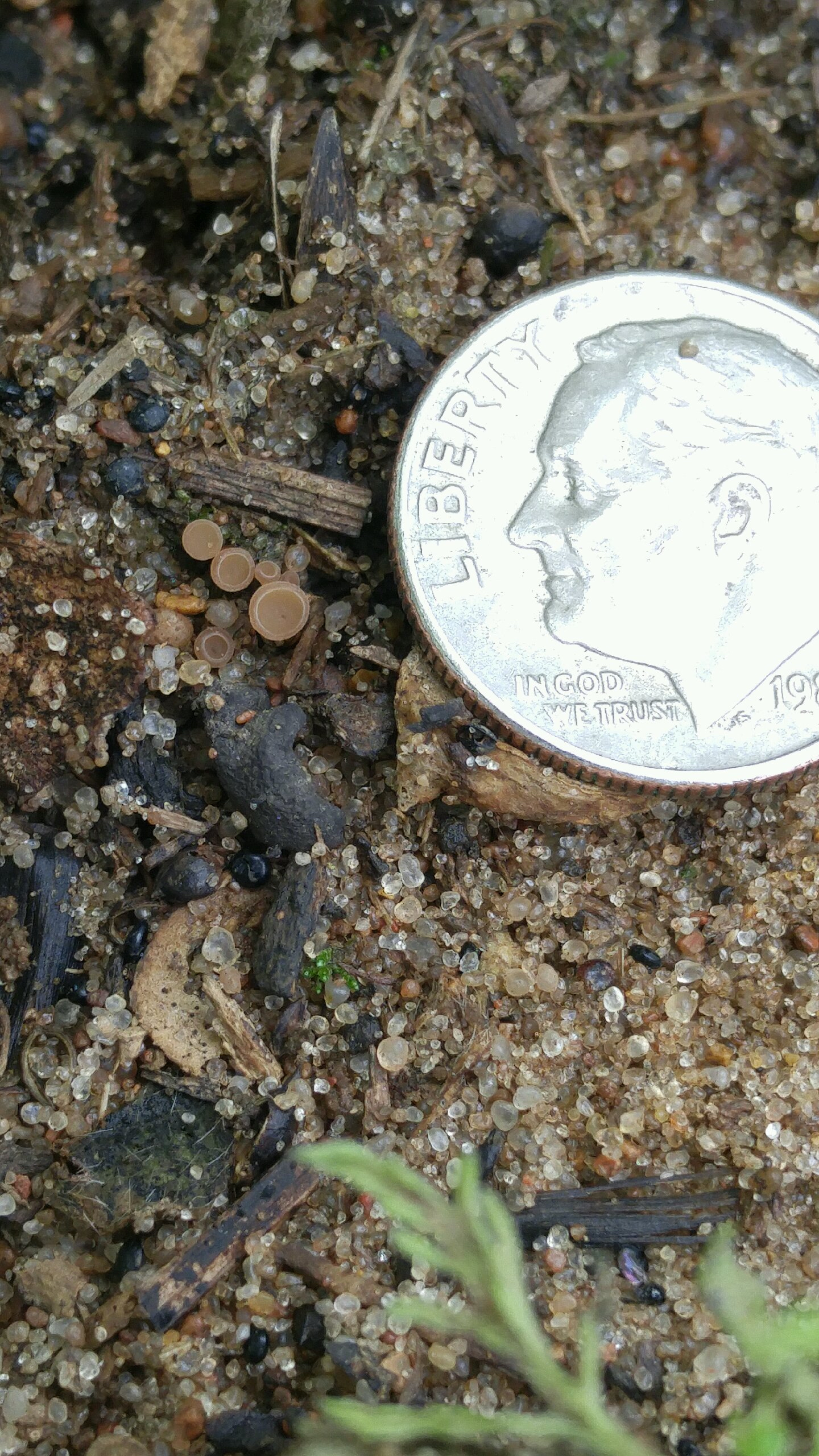
This image captures a cluster of apothecia from a downward angle, so that only the tops are visible. The apothecia in this photo are circular, tan, and have a white lining near the edge of the structure. For size reference, a dime is also included.

The lifecycle of Sclerotinia sclerotiorum can be described as monocyclic, as there are no secondary innoculums produced. During late summer to early fall, the fungus will produce a survival structure called a sclerotium either on or inside the tissues of a host plant. S. sclerotiorum sclerotia can remain viable for at least three years and germinate to produce fruiting bodies called apothecia, which are small, thin stalks ending with a cup-like structure about 3–6 mm in diameter. The cup of the apothecium is lined with asci, in which the ascospores are contained. When the ascospores are released from the asci, they are carried by the wind until they land on a suitable host. The ascospores of S. sclerotiorum infect aboveground plant host tissue and begin to invade the host's tissues via mycelium, causing infection. S. sclerotiorum is capable of invading nearly all tissue types including stems, foliage, flowers, fruits, and roots. Eventually white, fluffy mycelium will begin to grow on the surface of the infected tissues. At the end of the growing season, S. sclerotiorum will once again produce sclerotia. The sclerotia will then remain on the surface of the ground or in the soil, on either living or dead plant parts until the next season. The lifecycle will then continue respectively.

There are two theories contending to explain the majority of S. sclerotiorum virulence: The oxalate-dependent theory and the pH-dependent theory. The oxalate theory was very credible because ultraviolet mutants producing knockout of oxalic acid production do have drastically reduced virulence. Similar results have also obtained with Botrytis cinerea, similarly an oxalic acid producing pathogen, with similar knockouts. However Davidson et al. 2016 and others have created transgenic hosts for oxalate oxidase and oxalate decarboxylase and charted the results day by day. They find that initial infection is not noticeably dependent on oxalate (although lesion expansion does require it for pH reduction and chelation of calcium). This supports the pH theory, with oxalates being merely a part of pH.

== Control ==
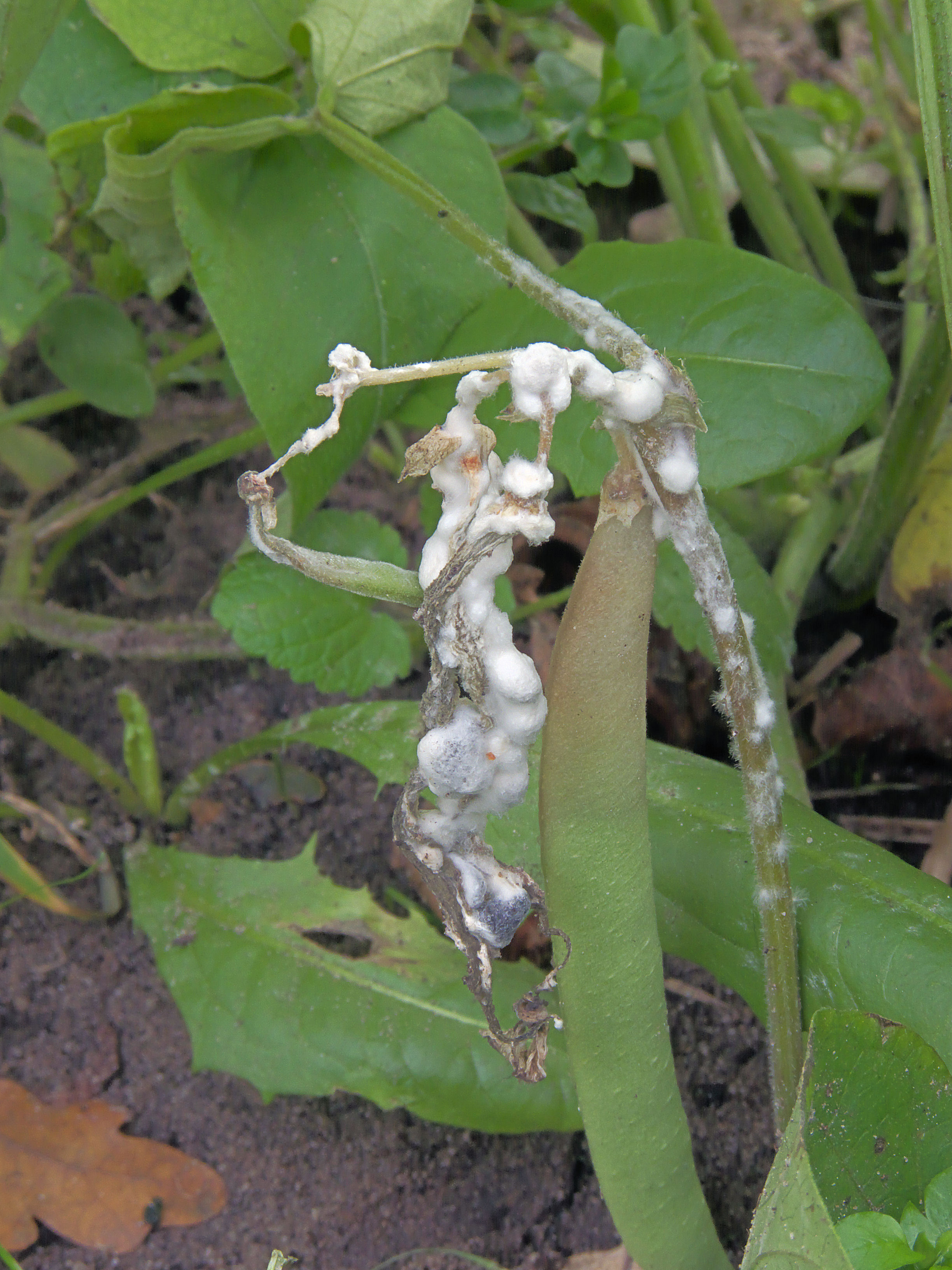
Sclerotinia sclerotiorum on bushbean

Control of white mold on crops can depend greatly on cultural, biological, and chemical practices. Cultural practices include planting disease resistant crops, planting at lower densities and higher row spacing to promote air circulation. This would allow for creation of microclimates that are less favorable for disease development. Besides that, excessive irrigation should be avoided until flowering (which is the most active period of infection) has ceased. Furthermore, in susceptible areas, crop rotations should include at least two to three years of non-host crops (for example cereals and corn). Good weed control can also limit the amount of host plants in a field and reduce white mold pressure. Fields with heavy disease pressure may also be flooded for a period of four to five weeks until the sclerotia lose their viability. Tillage reduction can also reduce the number of viable S. sclerotiorum spores.

Coniothyrium minitans, a coelomycete distributed worldwide, is a pathogen of S. sclerotiorum and is a commercial biocontrol agent for sclerotinia stem rot. Application of C. minitans should occur three months before S. sclerotiorum development and be incorporated into the soil. Correct use of C. minitans can reduce S. sclerotiorum by 95% and sclerotinia stem rot 10 to 70%.

Systemic and contact fungicides are registered for white molds. For instance, in soybeans, there are three classes of fungicides that are labeled for white mold control: methyl benzimidazole carbamates, succinate dehydrogenase inhibitors, and demethylation inhibitors. Additionally, herbicides containing lactofen have also been reported to indirectly control white mold. However, the use of lactofen herbicides can harm crops in years without high disease potential.

== Potential as a bioherbicide ==
Despite its broad host range (and partly because of it), this species has been proposed as a potentially useful bioherbicide or mycoherbicide. Notably it is not known to infect common forage grass species like ryegrass (Lolium spp.), and appears to be incapable of causing disease symptoms in clover. Due to the ubiquitous nature of this fungus in temperate climates, research has shown that wild-type sclerotium-forming isolates would be safe to use in permanent grass/clover pastures in these regions of the world, and its application for weed control would not to lead unusual levels of inoculum (airborne ascospores and soil-borne sclerotia) in the environment beyond the application site or increased disease risk to non-target plants because of its limited dispersibility.
