= Oxalobacter paraformigenes =

Scientific classification
- Domain: Bacteria
- Kingdom: Pseudomonadati
- Phylum: Pseudomonadota
- Class: Betaproteobacteria
- Order: Burkholderiales
- Family: Oxalobacteraceae
- Genus: Oxalobacter
- Species: O. paraformigenes

Binomial name
- Oxalobacter paraformigenes Chmiel et al, 2022

Type strain
- Oxalobacter paraformigenes HOxBLS^{T}

Species of bacterium

Oxalobacter paraformigenes is a Gram negative, non-spore-forming, oxalate-degrading anaerobic bacterium that was first isolated from human fecal samples. O. paraformigenes may have a role in calcium oxalate kidney stone disease because of its unique ability to utilize oxalate as its primary carbon source.

== Taxonomy ==
Oxalobacter paraformigenes was originally thought to be a subgroup of Oxalobacter formigenes. Based on fatty acid profile, 16S ribosomal RNA sequencing, and DNA probes specific to the oxc (oxalyl-CoA decarboxylase) gene and frc (formyl-CoA transferase), O. paraformigenes strain HOxBLS was considered a group II strain. However, whole genome sequencing revealed that O. paraformigenes HOxBLS is a different species from O. formigenes and it was subsequently renamed. The new species name paraformigenes uses the parent species formigenes and adds the Greek prefix para meaning "beside", owing to that for the longest time O. paraformigenes was the only group II strain with a full genome sequence and it was used to make genetic comparisons between group I strains (now known as O. formigenes).

== Genome ==
The genome of O. paraformigenes was sequenced as part of the Human Microbiome Project and is approximately 2.5 Mb with a G+C content of approximately 52.7%. O. paraformigenes has a slightly higher G+C content than O. formigenes and slightly more gene sequences.

== Growth in culture ==
O. paraformigenes grows in CO_{2}-bicarbonate buffered oxalate media and is typically cultivated in anaerobic Hungate tubes or an anaerobic chamber. Oxalate is supplemented at 20 – 100 mM (depending on desired cell density) and bacteria are grown at 37 °C for 24 – 48 hours. Anaerobic roll tubes, which are opaque agar filled Hungate tubes are used for bacterial isolation.
