= Sodium hydrogenoxalate =

Partly deprotonated oxalic acid

Names
- Preferred IUPAC name Sodium 2-hydroxy-2-oxoacetate
- Other names: Ethanedioate, hydrogen sodium salt (1:1:1); Ethanedioic acid, sodium salt (1:1); Monosodium oxalate; Sodium hydrogen ethanedioate (1:1:1); Sodium acid oxalate; Sodium binoxalate

Identifiers
CAS Number	1186-49-8
3D model (JSmol)	Interactive image
ChemSpider	4953678
ECHA InfoCard	100.013.356
EC Number	214-691-3
PubChem CID	23684893
UNII	2T9TH558WS
CompTox Dashboard (EPA)	DTXSID1047499
- InChI: InChI=1S/C2H2O4.Na/c3-1(4)2(5)6;/h(H,3,4)(H,5,6);/q;+1/p-1 Key: UJRAXLUXHBUNDO-UHFFFAOYSA-M
- SMILES: [Na+].[O-]C(=O)C(=O)O

Properties
Chemical formula	NaHC_{2}O_{4}
Molar mass	112.016 g·mol^{−1}
Appearance	Colorless crystalline solid

Structure
Crystal structure	Triclinic
Space group	P1̅
Lattice constant	a = 6.503 Å, b = 6.673 Å, c = 5.698 Å α = 85.04°, β = 110.00°, γ = 105.02°
Formula units (Z)	2

Hazards
- GHS labelling
Pictograms	(GHS07: Exclamation mark)
Signal word	Warning
Hazard statements	H302, H312, H315, H319, H332, H335
Precautionary statements	P261, P280, P301+P312, P302+P352, P304+P340, P305+P351+P338, P332+P313
NFPA 704 (fire diamond)	2 0 0

Related compounds
Other anions	Sodium bicarbonate
Other cations	Potassium hydrogenoxalate; Sodium oxalate
Related compounds	Oxalic acid
- Except where otherwise noted, data are given for materials in their standard state (at 25 °C [77 °F], 100 kPa). Infobox references

Sodium hydrogenoxalate or sodium hydrogen oxalate is a chemical compound with the chemical formula NaHC_{2}O_{4}. It is an ionic compound. It is a sodium salt of oxalic acid H_{2}C_{2}O_{4}. It is an acidic salt, because it consists of sodium cations Na^{+} and hydrogen oxalate anions HC_{2}O^{−}_{4} or HO−C(=O)−CO^{−}_{2}, in which only one acidic hydrogen atom in oxalic acid is replaced by sodium atom. The hydrogen oxalate anion can be described as the result of removing one hydrogen ion H^{+} from oxalic acid, or adding one to the oxalate anion C_{2}O^{2−}_{4}.

== Properties ==
=== Hydrates ===
The compound is commonly encountered as the anhydrous form or as the monohydrate NaHC_{2}O_{4}·H_{2}O. Both are colorless crystalline solids at ambient temperature.

The monohydrate can be obtained by evaporating a solution of the compound at room temperature.

=== Reactions ===
Upon being heated, sodium hydrogenoxalate converts to oxalic acid and sodium oxalate, the latter of which decomposes into sodium carbonate and carbon monoxide.

2 NaHC_{2}O_{4} → Na_{2}C_{2}O_{4} + H_{2}C_{2}O_{4}

Na_{2}C_{2}O_{4} → Na_{2}CO_{3} + CO

== Toxicity ==
The health hazards posed by this compound are largely due to its acidity and to the toxic effects of oxalic acid and other oxalate or hydrogenoxalate salts, which can follow ingestion or absorption through the skin. The toxic effects include necrosis of tissues due to sequestration of calcium ions Ca^{2+}, and the formation of poorly soluble calcium oxalate crystals in the kidneys that can obstruct the kidney tubules.
