= Oxalobacter aliiformigenes =

Scientific classification
- Domain: Bacteria
- Kingdom: Pseudomonadati
- Phylum: Pseudomonadota
- Class: Betaproteobacteria
- Order: Burkholderiales
- Family: Oxalobacteraceae
- Genus: Oxalobacter
- Species: O. aliiformigenes

Binomial name
- Oxalobacter aliiformigenes Chmiel et al, 2022

Type strain
- Oxalobacter aliiformigenes Va3^{T}

Species of bacterium

Oxalobacter aliiformigenes is a Gram negative, non-spore-forming, oxalate-degrading anaerobic bacterium that was first isolated from human fecal samples. O. aliiformigenes consumes oxalate as its main carbon source but is negative for indole production and negative for sulfate and nitrate reduction. Cells appear rod shaped, though occasionally present as curved, and do not possess flagella.

O. aliiformigenes is found in the gastrointestinal tract of humans, and is typically isolated from human feces. O. aliiformigenes is believed to have roles in mitigating calcium oxalate kidney stone disease and primary hyperoxaluria because of its unique ability to utilize oxalate as its primary carbon source and prevent absorption of oxalate.

== Taxonomy ==
Oxalobacter aliiformigenes was originally thought to be a subgroup of Oxalobacter formigenes based on fatty acid profile, 16S ribosomal RNA sequencing, and DNA probes specific to the oxc (oxalyl-CoA decarboxylase) gene and frc (formyl-CoA transferase). However, full genomes were sequenced and based on average nucleotide identity calculation, digital DNA-DNA hybridization, and phylogenetic tree analyses, O. aliiformigenes was determined to be a distinct species.

== Antibiotic resistance and susceptibility ==
Oxalobacter aliiformigenes demonstrates in vitro resistance to amoxicillin, ampicillin, ceftriaxone, cephalexin, streptomycin, and vancomycin; and in vitro sensitivity to clarithromycin, clindamycin, ciprofloxacin, doxycycline, gentamicin, and tetracycline.

== Genome ==
The genome of O. aliiformigenes has been sequenced and is 2.2 – 2.4 Mb with a G+C content of 50.9 - 51.5%. Beta-lactamase genes present in the genome may provide resistance to beta-lactam antibiotics.

== Growth in Culture ==
O. aliiformigenes grows in CO_{2}-bicarbonate buffered oxalate media and is typically cultivated in anaerobic Hungate tubes or an anaerobic chamber. Oxalate is supplemented at 20 – 100 mM (depending on desired cell density) and bacteria are grown at 37 °C for 24 – 72 hours. Acetate is required for cultivation but does not support growth alone. Bacteria can grow adequately in pH ranges of 7.0 - 2.0. Higher concentrations of bile salts impair growth but lower concentrations are tolerated. The species can tolerate some levels of oxygen but cell numbers are diminished.

Bacteria are isolated using anaerobic roll tubes, which are Hungate tubes filled with opaque oxalate agar media that display zones of clearance upon successful Oxalobacter cultivation.
