= Oxalate CoA-transferase =

Class of enzymes

Identifiers
- EC no.: 2.8.3.2
- CAS no.: 9026-17-9

Databases
- BRENDA: enzyme data
- ExPASy: NiceZyme view
- KEGG: enzyme entry
- MetaCyc: metabolic pathway
- Rhea: reactions
- PDB structures: RCSB PDB PDBe PDBsum
- Gene Ontology: AmiGO / QuickGO
Search
- PMC: articles
- PubMed: articles
- NCBI: proteins

Oxalate CoA-transferase (EC 2.8.3.2) is an enzyme that catalyzes the chemical reaction

oxalic acid
+
succinyl-CoA
succinic acid
+
oxalyl-CoA

The two substrates of this enzyme characterised from Pseudomonas oxalaticus are oxalic acid and succinyl-CoA. Its products are succinic acid and oxalyl-CoA. The enzyme is similar to one found in Oxalobacter formigenes, a bacterium present in human gut.

This enzyme is a transferase, specifically a CoA-transferase. The systematic name of this enzyme class is succinyl-CoA:oxalate CoA-transferase. Other names in common use include succinyl-beta-ketoacyl-CoA transferase, and oxalate coenzyme A-transferase.
