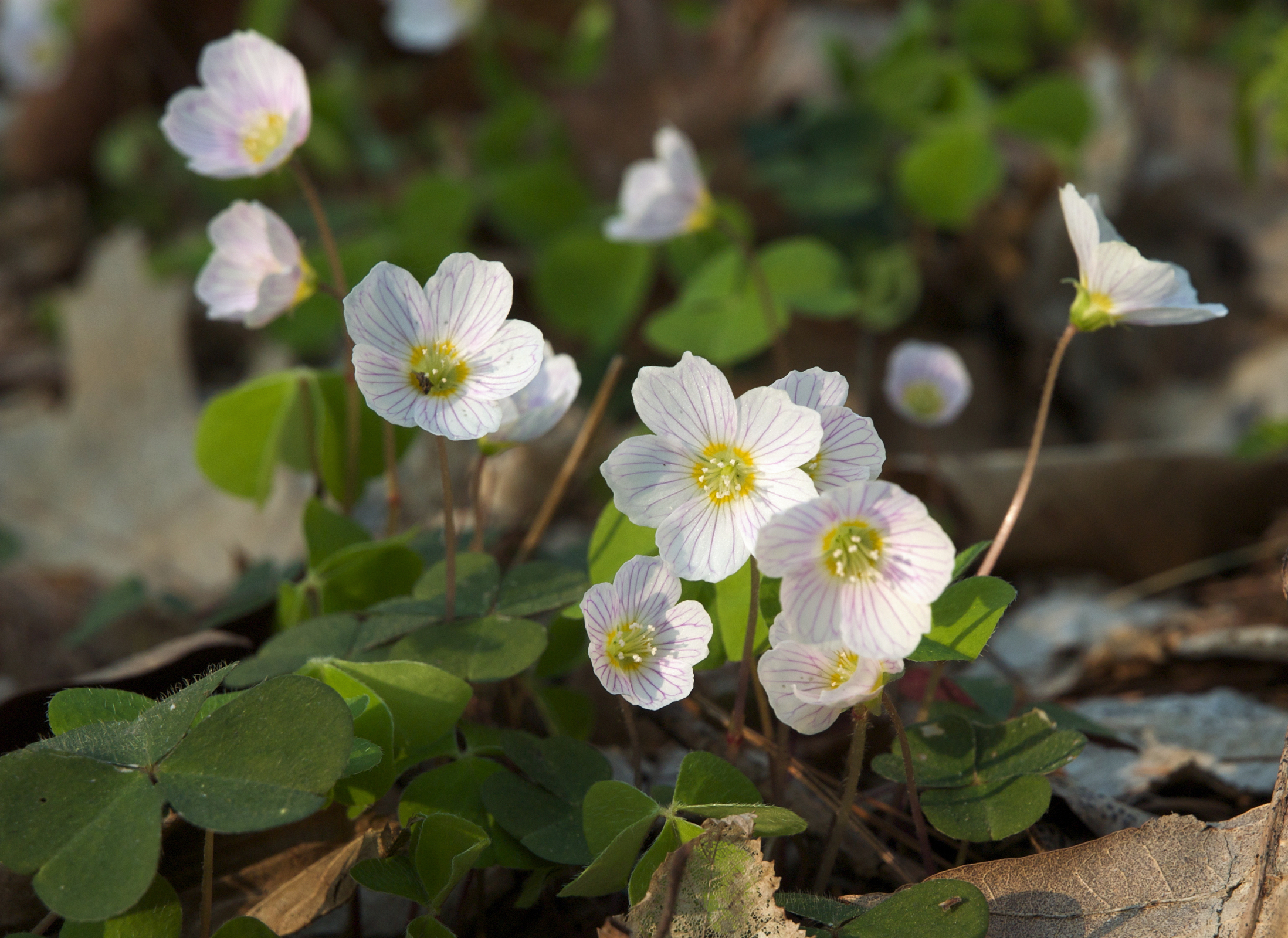

Scientific classification
- Kingdom: Plantae
- Clade: Tracheophytes
- Clade: Angiosperms
- Clade: Eudicots
- Clade: Rosids
- Order: Oxalidales
- Family: Oxalidaceae
- Genus: Oxalis
- Species: O. acetosella

Binomial name
- Oxalis acetosella L.

= Oxalis acetosella =

Wood-sorrel

Species of flowering plant

Oxalis acetosella, also known as wood-sorrel or common wood-sorrel, is a herbaceous rhizomatous flowering plant in the family Oxalidaceae. The specific epithet acetosella refers to its sour taste. The common name wood-sorrel is often used for other plants in the genus Oxalis.

In much of its range, most of Europe and parts of Asia, it is the only member of its genus and hence simply known as wood-sorrel. While 'common wood-sorrel' may be used to differentiate it from most other species, this name is also used for the North American Oxalis montana.

== Description ==
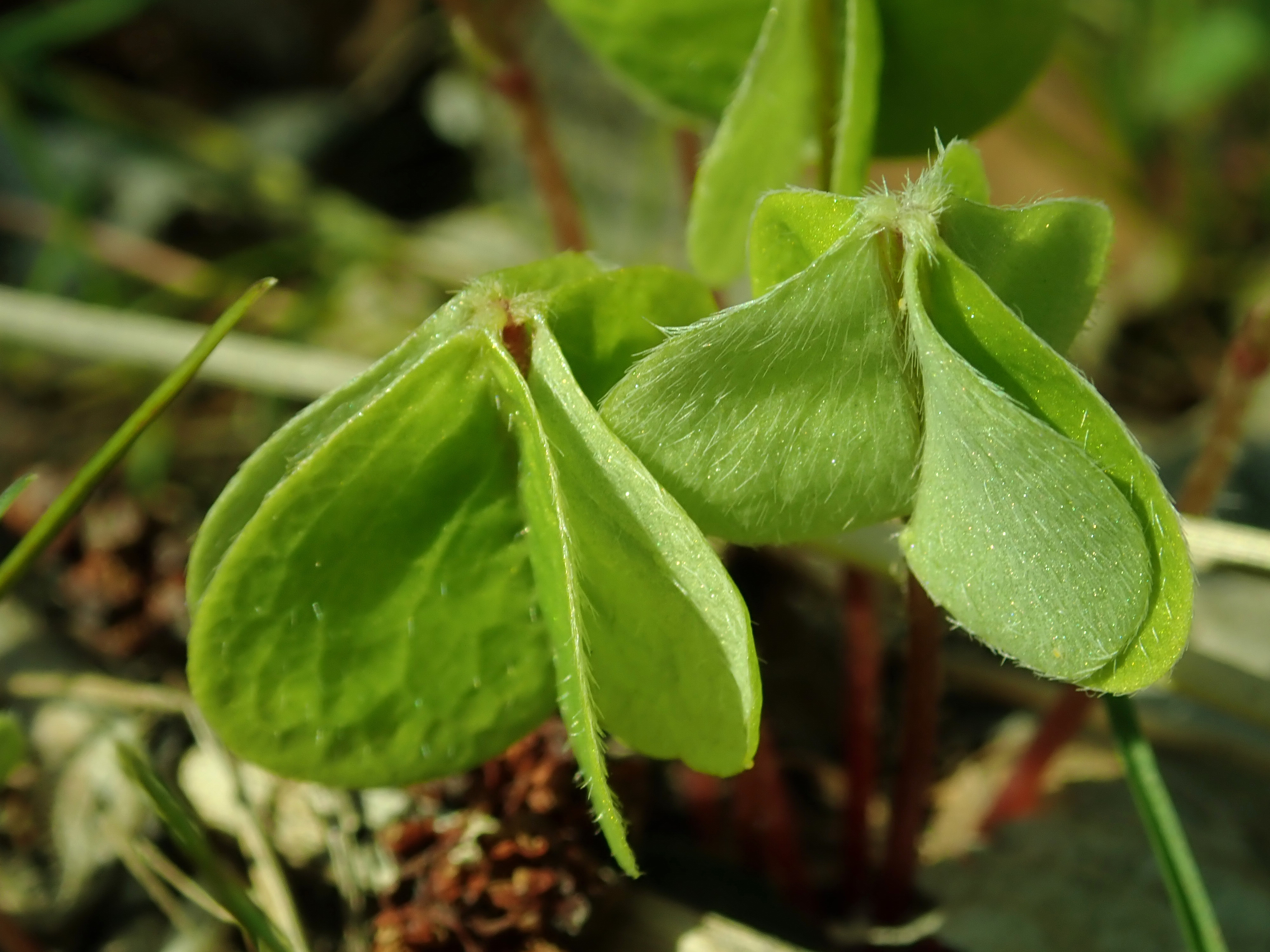
Showing the leaves folded

The plant grows up to 10 centimetres (4 in) tall. It has trifoliate compound leaves, the leaflets heart-shaped and folded through the middle, that occur in groups of three on the long petioles, and are finely pubescent. The flowers are produced singly on thin, wiry stems from spring to midsummer; they are small, open-faced, with five petals 8–15 mm long, which are white with pink or reddish venation. The flowers rarely appear reddish or mauve. During the night or when it rains, the flowers close and the leaves fold.

=== Similar species ===
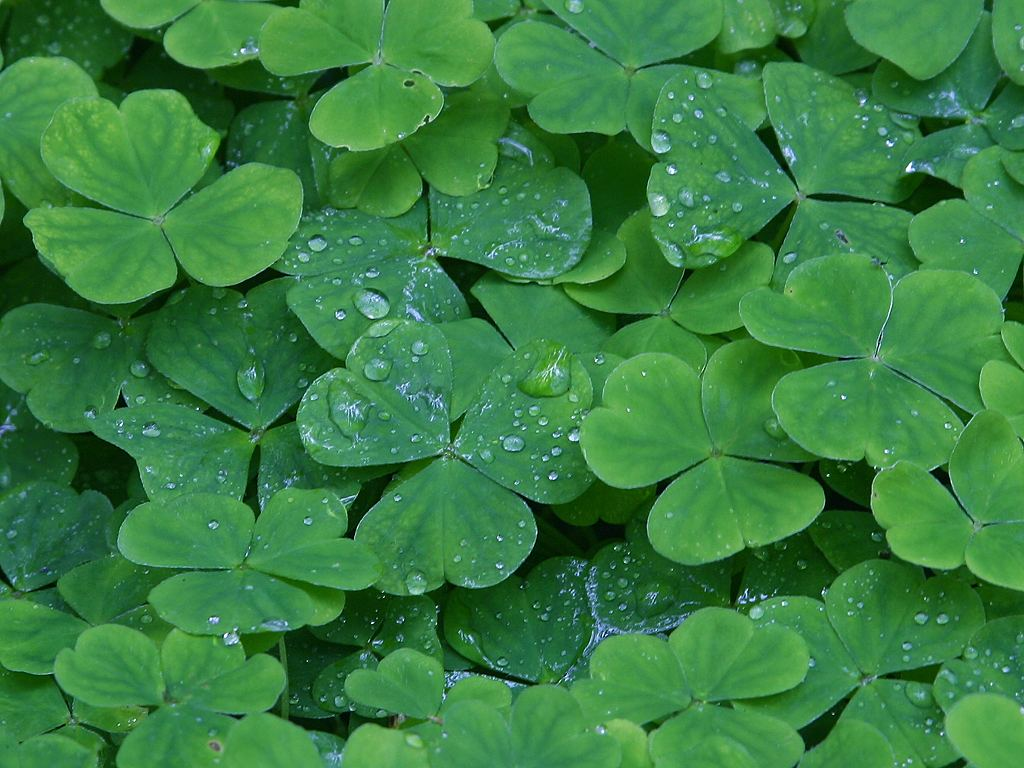
O. acetosella at Phoenix Park, Dublin

Anemonoides nemorosa (wood anemone) is similar. Both have white flowers, are small, and are found in woody shady places. Anemonoides nemorosa however has palmately lobed leaves and does not have true petals but large sepals which are petal-like.

== Distribution and habitat ==
It grows in woods and shady places across most of Europe and northern and central Asia. It is commonly found throughout Great Britain and Ireland, except for The Fens where it is rare. It occurs on a wide range of moist soils, both lime-rich and acidic, in Britain from sea level up to 1,160 m (3,810 ft) in central Scotland (and higher in southern Europe and Asia); it is also tolerant of deep shade, including even dense young conifer plantations. It formerly also occurred in Algeria in North Africa, but is now extinct there.

== Uses ==
As with other species of wood-sorrel, the leaves are sometimes eaten by humans, but are high in oxalic acid. An oxalate called "sal acetosella" was formerly extracted from the plant by boiling it.

== In culture ==
The common wood-sorrel is sometimes referred to as a shamrock and may be given as a gift on Saint Patrick's Day. This may have begun in 1830, when an English botanist James Bicheno claimed wood sorrel to be true shamrock, due to its prettier trifoliate clover-like leaf, its early flowering in March, and because it can be eaten. Despite this, it is more generally accepted that the plant described as "true" shamrock is a species of clover, usually lesser clover (Trifolium dubium).

Wood-sorrel is also known as Alleluia because it blossoms between Easter and Pentecost, when the Psalms which end with Hallelujah are sung.

== Infructescence ==
Seed pods in autumn

Seed pods and seeds, developed and unfertilized
