= Oxalobacter paeniformigenes =

Scientific classification
- Domain: Bacteria
- Kingdom: Pseudomonadati
- Phylum: Pseudomonadota
- Class: Betaproteobacteria
- Order: Burkholderiales
- Family: Oxalobacteraceae
- Genus: Oxalobacter
- Species: O. paeniformigenes

Binomial name
- Oxalobacter paeniformigenes Chmiel et al, 2022

Type strain
- Oxalobacter paeniformigenes OxGP1^{T}

Species of bacterium

Oxalobacter paeniformigenes is a Gram negative, non-spore-forming, oxalate-degrading anaerobic bacterium that was first isolated from human fecal samples. Similar to other species in the Oxalobacter genus, O. paeniformigenes uses oxalate as its primary carbon source. O. paeniformigenes is negative for indole production and negative for sulfate and nitrate reduction. Cells appear rod shaped, though occasionally present as curved, and do not possess flagella.

The Type strain, OxGP1, was isolated from Guinea pig cecal contents.

== Taxonomy ==
Oxalobacter paeniformigenes was originally thought to be a subgroup of Oxalobacter formigenes. Based on fatty acid profile and oxc (oxalyl-CoA decarboxylase) gene analysis, O. paeniformigenes strain OxGP1 was considered a group II strain. However, 16S ribosomal RNA sequencing placed strain OxGP1 into group I.

Whole genome sequencing confirmed that O. paeniformigenes strain OxGP1 is a different species from O. formigenes and it was subsequently renamed. The new species name paeniformigenes uses the parent species formigenes and adds the Latin prefix paeni meaning "almost", owing to the observation that species is related to but distinct from the parent species, O. formigenes.

== Genome ==
The genome of O. paeniformigenes is approximately 1.9 Mb with a G+C content of approximately 53.8%. O. paeniformigenes has a smaller genome with slightly higher G+C content compared to other Oxalobacter species.

== Growth in culture ==
O. paeniformigenes grows in CO_{2}-bicarbonate buffered oxalate media and is typically cultivated in anaerobic Hungate tubes or an anaerobic chamber. Oxalate is supplemented at 20 – 100 mM (depending on desired cell density) and bacteria are grown at 37 °C for 24 – 48 hours. Anaerobic roll tubes, which are opaque agar filled Hungate tubes are used for bacterial isolation.
