= Basic zirconium oxalate =

Names
- Other names: Dihydroxide zirconium oxalate; Zirconium hydroxide oxalate

Identifiers
CAS Number	33943-34-9; 1476716-63-8 hemihydrate
3D model (JSmol)	Interactive image
- InChI: InChI=1S/C2H2O4.2H2O.Zr/c3-1(4)2(5)6;;;/h(H,3,4)(H,5,6);2*1H2;/q;;;+4/p-4 Key: VNWSFXNEHHNDCE-UHFFFAOYSA-J
- SMILES: [OH-].[OH-].[Zr+4].[O-]C(=O)C([O-])=O

Properties
Chemical formula	Zr(OH)_{2}(C_{2}O_{4})
Molar mass	213.26 g/mol
Appearance	Crystalline solid

Structure
Crystal structure	Tetragonal
Space group	I4/m, No. 87
- Except where otherwise noted, data are given for materials in their standard state (at 25 °C [77 °F], 100 kPa). Infobox references

Basic zirconium oxalate is an inorganic compound and coordination polymer with the formula Zr(OH)_{2}(C_{2}O_{4}). It contains zirconium in the +4 oxidation state and consists of a three-dimensional framework built from hydroxide- and oxalate-bridged zirconium centres. A hemihydrate, Zr(OH)_{2}(C_{2}O_{4})·0.5H_{2}O, is also known and behaves as a microporous host with reversible water sorption.

== Preparation ==
The hemihydrate can be prepared by controlled diffusion of zirconyl nitrate and oxalic acid through a silica-gel medium.

Anhydrous basic zirconium oxalate can then be obtained by thermal removal of the guest water from the hemihydrate.

A later preparation produced crystalline Zr(OH)_{2}(C_{2}O_{4}) by slow evaporation of an acidic solution containing basic zirconium nitrate and oxalic acid at about 50 °C.

== Properties ==
=== Structure ===
Both the hemihydrate and anhydrous compound crystallize in the tetragonal crystal system, in space group I4/m (No. 87).

The structure is a three-dimensional coordination framework. In the anhydrous material, it can be described as an interconnection of zirconium hydroxide chains, ^{1}_{∞}[Zr(OH)_{2}]^{2+}, and zirconium oxalate chains, ^{1}_{∞}[Zr(C_{2}O_{4})]^{2+}.

The oxalate groups act as bridging ligands between zirconium centres, while hydroxide ligands form additional bridges to generate the three-dimensional network.

=== Porosity and hydration ===
The hemihydrate, Zr(OH)_{2}(C_{2}O_{4})·0.5H_{2}O, is microporous. Its water molecules occupy cavities in the zirconium–oxalate framework rather than being required for the connectivity of the framework itself.

Heating removes the guest water without destroying the crystalline framework, giving anhydrous Zr(OH)_{2}(C_{2}O_{4}). Exposure of the anhydrous phase to water restores the hydrated phase. The dehydration and rehydration therefore occur by reversible single-crystal-to-single-crystal transformations.

=== Thermal decomposition ===
After dehydration, further heating causes condensation of hydroxide groups and decomposition of the oxalate ligands.

Thermal analysis indicates formation of an intermediate approximated by Zr_{2}O(CO_{3})(C_{2}O_{4}) during decomposition of the basic oxalate.

At higher temperature, the organic component is destroyed and zirconium dioxide is formed. Modern thermal studies found that decomposition of alkali-free zirconium oxalates initially produces amorphous zirconia together with residual carbon; oxidation of the carbon at about 540 °C occurs alongside crystallization of tetragonal ZrO_{2}.
