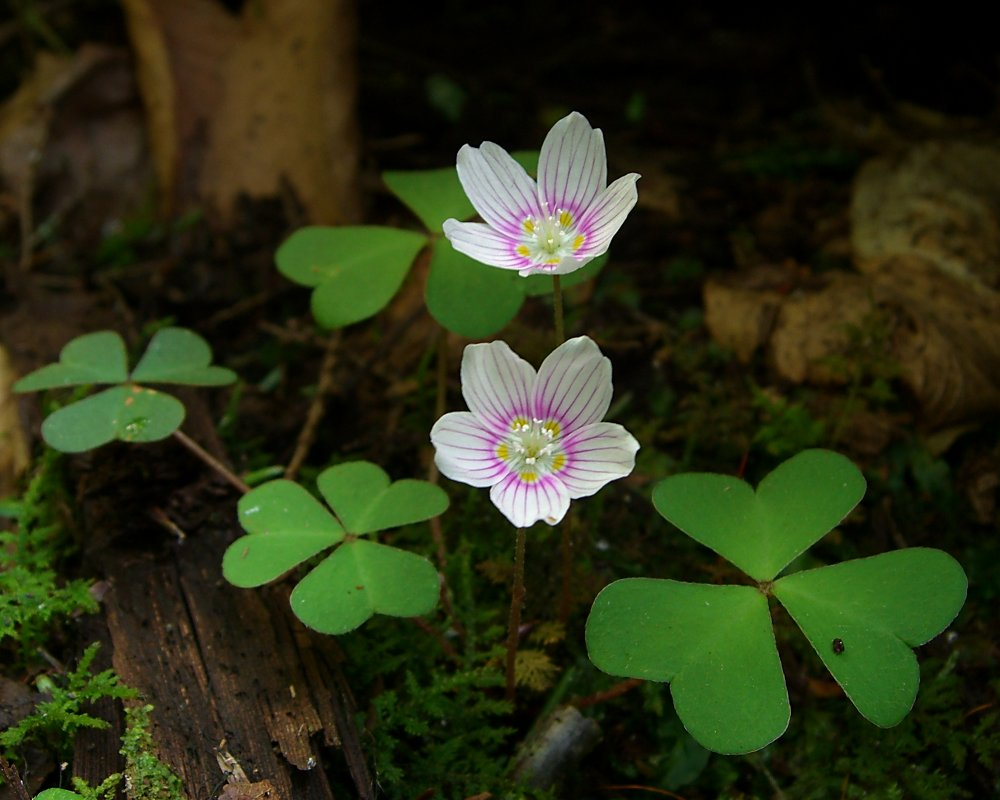

Conservation status
- Secure (NatureServe)

Scientific classification
- Kingdom: Plantae
- Clade: Tracheophytes
- Clade: Angiosperms
- Clade: Eudicots
- Clade: Rosids
- Order: Oxalidales
- Family: Oxalidaceae
- Genus: Oxalis
- Species: O. montana

Binomial name
- Oxalis montana Raf.

= Oxalis montana =

Species of flowering plant

Oxalis montana is a species of flowering plant in the family Oxalidaceae known by the common names mountain woodsorrel, wood shamrock, sours and white woodsorrel. It may also be called common woodsorrel, though this name also applies to its close relative, Oxalis acetosella.

This species is a perennial herb native to eastern North America, including eastern Canada and the north-central and eastern United States, and Appalachian Mountains. The Latin specific epithet montana refers to mountains or coming from mountains.

It is very similar to the Eurasian species Oxalis acetosella and has been treated by some botanists as a subspecies of it, O. acetosella subsp. montana (Raf.) Hultén.

== Description ==
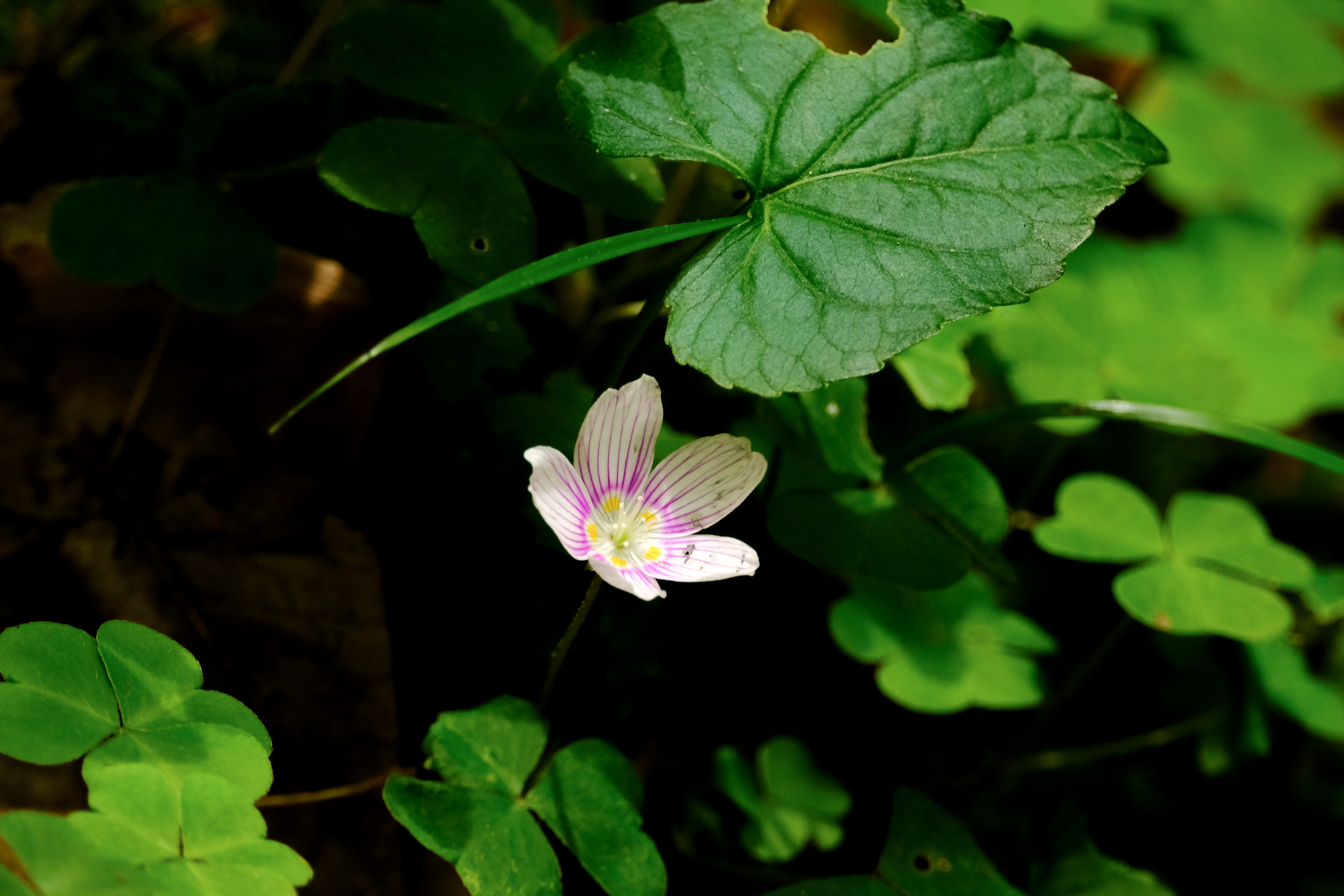
Mountain Wood Sorrel flower in Monongahela National Forest, West Virginia

Oxalis montana is a perennial herb which grows in patches connected by subterranean rhizomes. There are no stems, just clumps of leaves growing to about 10 centimeters (3.9 inches) in maximum height.

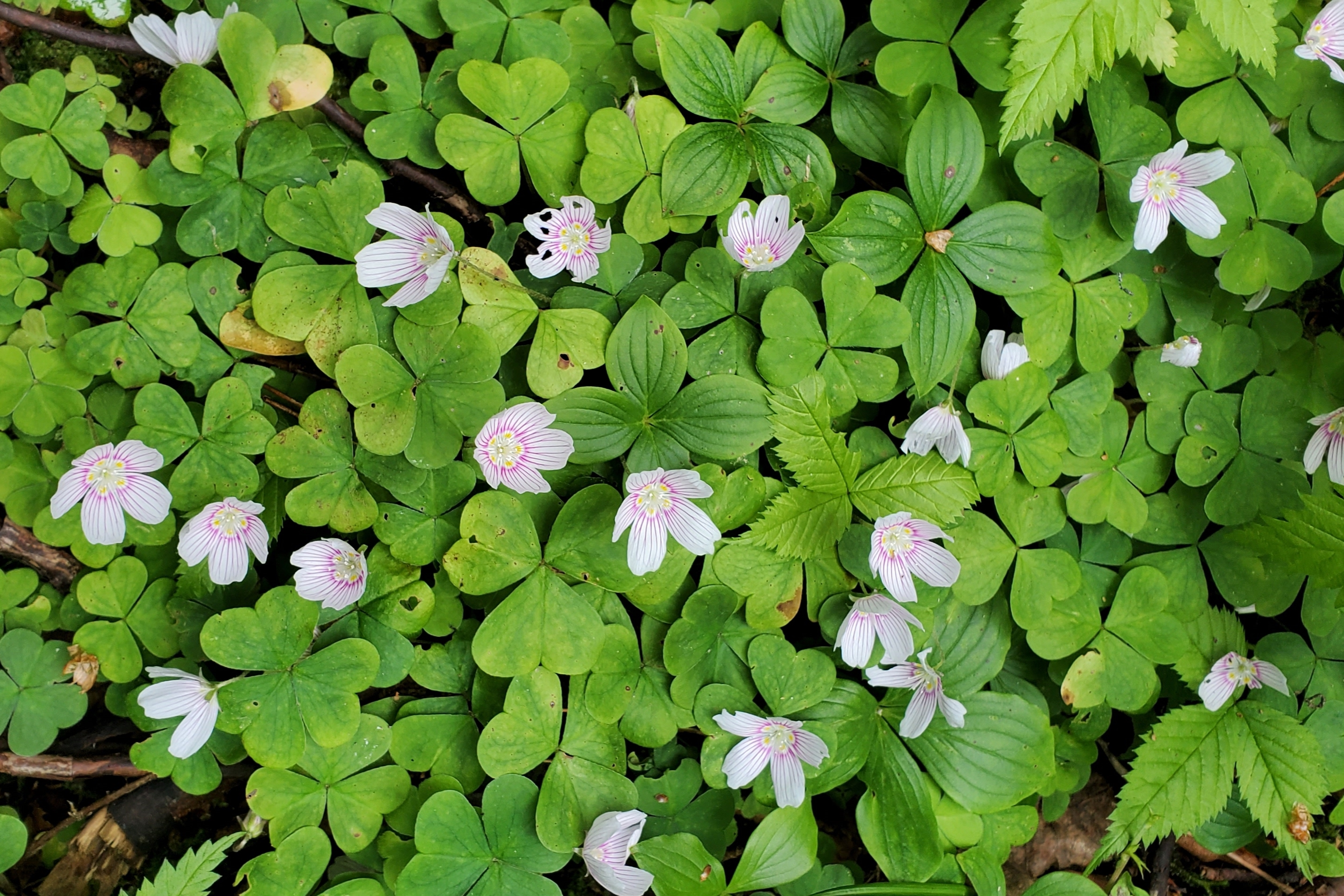
Patch of Oxalis montana in Fundy National Park

The leaves are each made up of three heart-shaped leaflets. The leaflets move, folding and unfolding, in response to sunlight.

There are two types of flowers, blooms that open and cleistogamous flowers that remain closed and self-pollinate. The flower color is variable. Environmental factors may cause variation; flowers growing at higher elevations have less color in the veins on the petals, while the veins of those at lower elevations have a deeper pink-purple coloration. The fruit is a capsule. The plant reproduces sexually by seed and asexually by sprouting large colonies from the rhizome. Some populations produce no flowers in a given season and reproduce only vegetatively.

== Ecology ==
This plant is a climax species, occurring in mature forests and tolerant of shade. It is a dominant herb in a number of ecosystems, such as the forests of the Appalachian Mountains. It occurs there in the understory of red spruce (Picea rubens) and balsam or Fraser fir (Abies balsamea or A. fraseri).

It is also dominant in northern hardwood forest habitat and its ecotones, in the understory of red or sugar maple (Acer rubrum or A. saccharum), yellow birch (Betula lutea), and American beech (Fagus grandifolia). Other dominant understory species growing with it include false lily-of-the-valley (Maianthemum canadense), goldthread (Coptis groenlandica), starflower (Trientalis borealis), and woodferns (Dryopteris spp.).

This plant's extensive root network helps it stabilize the soil. It can grow on flat ground or steep slopes. The climate is often cool and moist, with high humidity and precipitation, including fog drip, and areas of long-lasting snowpack. Wildfire is uncommon.

== Uses ==
The species is sour in flavor, and can be added to soup or salad. It contains oxalic acid, which can be poisonous in high quantities.
