= Oxalobacter vibrioformis =

Scientific classification
- Domain: Bacteria
- Kingdom: Pseudomonadati
- Phylum: Pseudomonadota
- Class: Betaproteobacteria
- Order: Burkholderiales
- Family: Oxalobacteraceae
- Genus: Oxalobacter
- Species: O. vibriformis

Binomial name
- Oxalobacter vibriformis Dehning & Schink

Type strain
- Oxalobacter vibrioformis WoOx3^{T}

Species of bacterium

Oxalobacter vibrioformis is an oxalate-degrading anaerobic bacterium that was isolated from anoxic freshwater sediments. O. vibrioformis is a Gram-negative, non-spore-forming, motile, vibrioid rod which belongs to the genus Oxalobacter. O. vibrioformis uses oxalate and oxamate as its sole source of energy and acetate as its main source of carbon.

== Genome ==
The genome of O. vibrioformis is approximately 2.6 Mb with a G+C content of 52%.
