= Hydrogenoxalate =

Ion

Names
- IUPAC name 2-Hydroxy-2-oxoacetate
- Systematic IUPAC name 2-Hydroxy-2-oxoethanoate
- Other names: Bioxalate; Hydrogen oxalate; Hydrogenoxalate

Identifiers
CAS Number	920-52-5
3D model (JSmol)	Interactive image
Beilstein Reference	3601755
ChEBI	CHEBI:46904
ChemSpider	2948058
Gmelin Reference	49515
PubChem CID	3716971
CompTox Dashboard (EPA)	DTXSID8043785
- InChI: InChI=1S/C2H2O4/c3-1(4)2(5)6/h(H,3,4)(H,5,6)/p-1 Key: MUBZPKHOEPUJKR-UHFFFAOYSA-M
- SMILES: C(=O)(C(=O)[O-])O

Properties
Chemical formula	HC_{2}O^{−}_{4}
Molar mass	89.026 g·mol^{−1}
Conjugate acid	Oxalic acid
Conjugate base	Oxalate
- Except where otherwise noted, data are given for materials in their standard state (at 25 °C [77 °F], 100 kPa). Infobox references

Hydrogenoxalate or hydrogen oxalate (IUPAC name: 2-Hydroxy-2-oxoacetate) is an anion with chemical formula HC_{2}O^{−}_{4} or HO−C(=O)−CO^{−}_{2}, derived from oxalic acid by the loss of a single proton; or, alternatively, from the oxalate anion C_{2}O^{2−}_{4} by addition of a proton. The name is also used for any salt containing this anion. Especially in older literature, hydrogenoxalates may also be referred to as bioxalates, acid oxalates, or monobasic oxalates. Hydrogenoxalate is amphoteric, in that it can react both as an acid or a base.

Well characterized salts include sodium hydrogenoxalate (NaHC_{2}O_{4}), potassium hydrogenoxalate (KHC_{2}O_{4}), ammonium hydrogenoxalate ([NH_{4}]^{+}HC_{2}O^{−}_{4}), rubidium hydrogenoxalate (RbHC_{2}O_{4}) and dimethylammonium hydrogenoxalate ([(CH_{3})_{2}NH]^{+}HC_{2}O^{−}_{4}).

== Structure ==
Most hydrogenoxalate salts are hydrated. For example, potassium hydrogen oxalate crystallizes as 2KHC_{2}O_{4}·H_{2}O. These materials exhibit extended structures resulting from extensive hydrogen bonding and anion-cation interactions. The hydrates dehydrate upon heating:

2KHC_{2}O_{4}·H_{2}O → 2 KHC_{2}O_{4} + H_{2}O

Proton transfer in hydrogen oxalates has been studied.

== See also ==
- Bicarbonate
