= Oxalate decarboxylase =

Class of enzymes

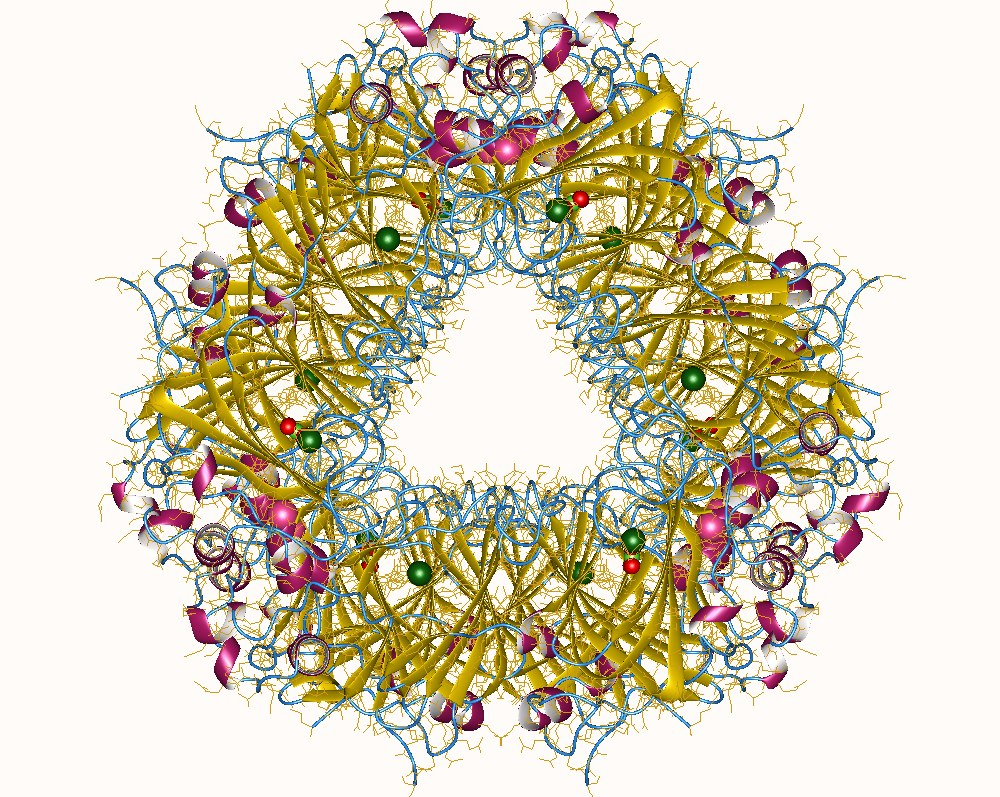
- Oxalate decarboxylase hexamer, Bacillus subtilis

Identifiers
- EC no.: 4.1.1.2
- CAS no.: 9024-97-9

Databases
- BRENDA: enzyme data
- ExPASy: NiceZyme view
- KEGG: enzyme entry
- MetaCyc: metabolic pathway
- Rhea: reactions
- PDB structures: RCSB PDB PDBe PDBsum
- Gene Ontology: AmiGO / QuickGO
Search
- PMC: articles
- PubMed: articles
- NCBI: proteins

Oxalate decarboxylase (EC 4.1.1.2) is an oxalate degrading enzyme characterised from Bacillus subtilis that catalyzes its decarboxylation to formic acid:

oxalic acid
CO_{2}
formic acid

The enzyme contains manganese as Mn^{2+}/Mn^{3+} and requires oxygen for the reaction. It is present in bacteria and fungi.

This enzyme is a lyase, specifically a carboxy-lyases, which cleave carbon-carbon bonds. The systematic name of this enzyme class is oxalate carboxy-lyase (formate-forming). This enzyme is also called oxalate carboxy-lyase.

== Structural studies ==
As of late 2007, 5 structures have been solved for this class of enzymes, with PDB accession codes PDB: 1UW8, PDB: 2UY8, PDB: 2UY9, PDB: 2UYA, and PDB: 2UYB.
