= Sodium oxalate =

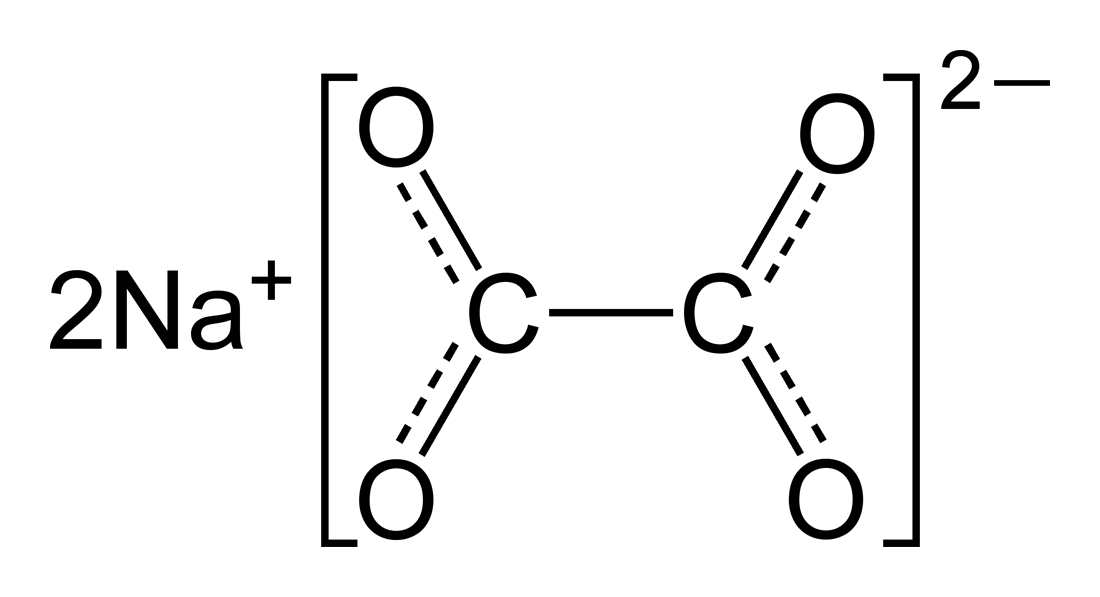
- Disodium oxalate

Names
- Preferred IUPAC name Disodium oxalate
- Other names Oxalic acid, disodium salt Sodium ethanedioate

Identifiers
CAS Number	62-76-0
3D model (JSmol)	Interactive image
ChEBI	CHEBI:132764
ChEMBL	ChEMBL182928
ChemSpider	5895
ECHA InfoCard	100.000.501
EC Number	200-550-3
PubChem CID	6125
RTECS number	K11750000
UNII	7U0V68LT9X
CompTox Dashboard (EPA)	DTXSID1037018
- InChI: InChI=1S/C2H2O4.2Na/c3-1(4)2(5)6;;/h(H,3,4)(H,5,6);;/q;2*+1/p-2 Key: ZNCPFRVNHGOPAG-UHFFFAOYSA-L
- SMILES: C(=O)(C(=O)[O-])[O-].[Na+].[Na+]

Properties
Chemical formula	Na_{2}C_{2}O_{4}
Molar mass	133.998 g·mol^{−1}
Appearance	White crystalline solid
Odor	Odorless
Density	2.34 g/cm^{3}
Melting point	250 °C (482 °F; 523 K) decomposes
Solubility in water	3.61 g/100 g

Structure
Crystal structure	monoclinic

Hazards
- GHS labelling
Pictograms	(GHS07: Exclamation mark)
Signal word	Warning
Hazard statements	H302, H312
Precautionary statements	P280, P301+P312, P302+P352
NFPA 704 (fire diamond)	1 0 0
- Lethal dose or concentration (LD, LC)
LD_{50} (median dose)	11160 mg/kg (oral, rat)
- Except where otherwise noted, data are given for materials in their standard state (at 25 °C [77 °F], 100 kPa). verify (what is ?) Infobox references

Sodium oxalate, or disodium oxalate, is a chemical compound with the chemical formula Na_{2}C_{2}O_{4}. It is the sodium salt of oxalic acid. It contains sodium cations Na^{+} and oxalate anions C_{2}O^{2−}_{4}. It is a white, crystalline, odorless solid, that decomposes above its melting point.

Sodium oxalate can act as a reducing agent, and it may be used as a primary standard for standardizing potassium permanganate (KMnO_{4}) solutions.

The mineral form of sodium oxalate is natroxalate. It is only very rarely found and restricted to extremely sodic conditions of ultra-alkaline pegmatites.

== Preparation ==
Sodium oxalate can be prepared through the neutralization of oxalic acid with sodium hydroxide (NaOH) in a 1:2 acid-to-base molar ratio. Evaporation yields the anhydrous oxalate that can be thoroughly dried by heating to between 200 and 250 °C (392 and 482 °F).

Half-neutralization can be accomplished with NaOH in a 1:1 ratio which produces NaHC_{2}O_{4}, monobasic sodium oxalate or sodium hydrogenoxalate.

Alternatively, it can be produced by decomposing sodium formate by heating it at a temperature exceeding 360 °C (680 °F).

== Reactions ==
Sodium oxalate starts to decompose above the melting point of about 250 °C (482 °F) into sodium carbonate and carbon monoxide:

Na_{2}C_{2}O_{4} → Na_{2}CO_{3} + CO

When heated at between 200 and 525 °C (392 and 977 °F) with vanadium pentoxide in a 1:2 molar ratio, the above reaction is suppressed, yielding instead a sodium vanadium oxibronze with release of carbon dioxide

x Na_{2}C_{2}O_{4} + 2 V_{2}O_{5} → 2 Na_{x}V_{2}O_{5} + 2x CO_{2}

with x increasing up to 1 as the temperature increases.

Sodium oxalate is used to standardize potassium permanganate solutions. It is desirable that the temperature of the titration mixture be greater than 60 °C (140 °F) to ensure that all the permanganate added reacts quickly. The kinetics of the reaction are complex, and the manganese(II) ions (Mn^{2+}) formed catalyze the further reaction between permanganate and oxalic acid (formed in situ by the addition of excess sulfuric acid). The final equation is as follows:

5 Na_{2}C_{2}O_{4} + 2 KMnO_{4} + 8 H_{2}SO_{4} → K_{2}SO_{4} + 5 Na_{2}SO_{4} + 2 MnSO_{4} + 10 CO_{2} + 8 H_{2}O

== Biological activity ==
Like several other oxalates, sodium oxalate is toxic to humans. It can cause burning pain in the mouth, throat and stomach, bloody vomiting, headache, muscle cramps, cramps and convulsions, drop in blood pressure, heart failure, shock, coma, and possible death. The median lethal dose (LD_{50}) by ingestion of oxalates is 10–15 g/kg of body weight.

Sodium oxalate, like citrates, can also be used to remove calcium ions (Ca^{2+}) from blood plasma. It also prevents blood from clotting. Note that by removing calcium ions from the blood, sodium oxalate can impair brain function, and deposit calcium oxalate in the kidneys.
