= Oxalate oxidase =

oxalate oxidase
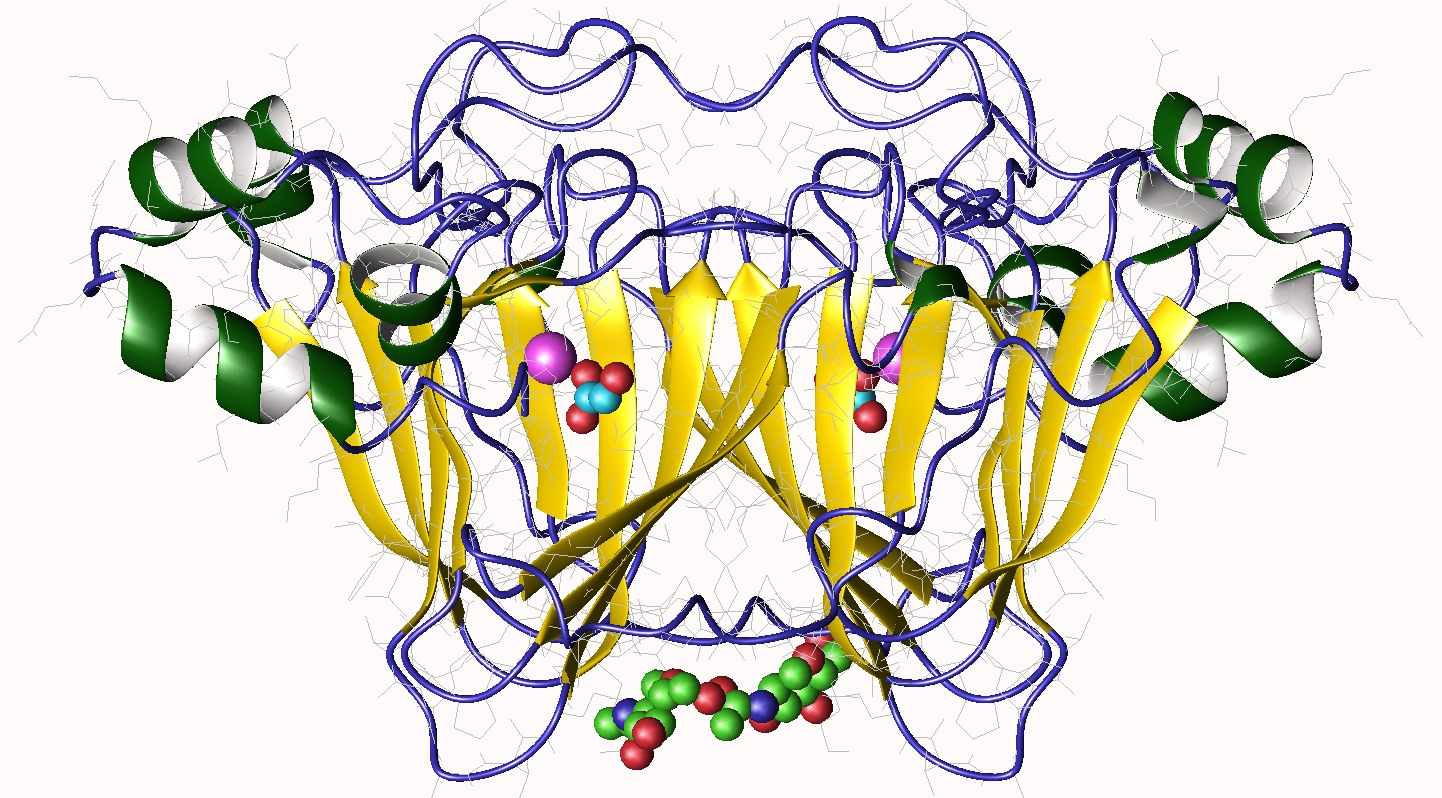
- Oxalate oxidase 1 dimer, Barley

Identifiers
- EC no.: 1.2.3.4
- CAS no.: 9031-79-2

Databases
- BRENDA: enzyme data
- ExPASy: NiceZyme view
- KEGG: enzyme entry
- MetaCyc: metabolic pathway
- Rhea: reactions
- PDB structures: RCSB PDB PDBe PDBsum
- Gene Ontology: AmiGO / QuickGO
Search
- PMC: articles
- PubMed: articles
- NCBI: proteins

In enzymology, oxalate oxidase (EC 1.2.3.4) is an oxalate degrading enzyme that catalyzes the chemical reaction:

oxalic acid
O_{2}
H_{2}O_{2}
O_{2}
H_{2}O_{2}
2 CO_{2}

The two substrates of this enzyme are oxalic acid and oxygen. Its products are carbon dioxide and hydrogen peroxide.

This enzyme belongs to the family of oxidoreductases, specifically those acting on the aldehyde or oxo group of donor with oxygen as acceptor. The systematic name of this enzyme class is oxalate:oxygen oxidoreductase. Other names in common use include aero-oxalo dehydrogenase, and oxalic acid oxidase. This enzyme participates in glyoxylate and dicarboxylate metabolism. It uses Manganese as a cofactor.

== Structural studies ==
As of late 2007, 4 structures have been solved for this class of enzymes, with PDB accession codes PDB: 1FI2, PDB: 2ET1, PDB: 2ET7, and PDB: 2ETE.
