= Oxalobacter =

Scientific classification
- Domain: Bacteria
- Kingdom: Pseudomonadati
- Phylum: Pseudomonadota
- Class: Betaproteobacteria
- Order: Burkholderiales
- Family: Oxalobacteraceae
- Genus: Oxalobacter; Allison et al. 1985

Type species
- Oxalobacter formigenes

Species
- Oxalobacter aliiformigenes Oxalobacter formigenes Oxalobacter paeniformigenes Oxalobacter paraformigenes Oxalobacter vibrioformis

Genus of bacteria

Oxalobacter is a genus of Gram-negative, obligate anaerobic, non-spore-forming bacteria in the Oxalobacteraceae family. Members of this genus are chemoorganotrophs, using oxalate as their primary carbon and energy source. The genus was first described in 1985 with the discovery of Oxalobacter formigenes.

The genus is best known for its role in the human gastrointestinal tract, where it may contribute to oxalate homeostasis and influence the risk of calcium oxalate kidney stone formation.

== Morphology and Physiology ==
All described Oxalobacter species are Gram-negative and strictly anaerobic. Although generally rod-shaped, slight morphological variability (e.g., curved rods) may be observed between species. Members of the Oxalobacter genus do not form spores and are non-motile.

These bacteria grow optimally in anaerobic environments using oxalate as their main carbon and energy source. Acetate and bicarbonate are used as co-substrates for optimal growth. The end products of oxalate metabolism are formate and carbon dioxide, via oxalyl-CoA decarboxylation.

== Ecology ==
Members of the Oxalobacter genus are primarily found in the gastrointestinal tracts of mammals, including humans and rodents. They may also be isolated from environmental sources such as freshwater. The ecological niche of Oxalobacter species is closely tied to the presence of dietary or endogenous oxalate.
