= Potassium hydrogenoxalate =

Chemical compound, salt of sorrel

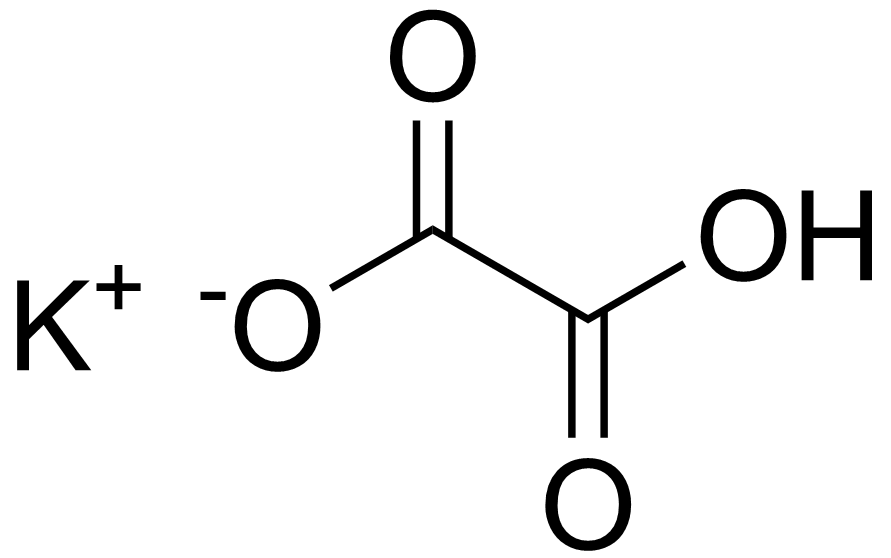

Names
- IUPAC name Potassium 2-hydroxy-2-oxoacetate
- Other names Potassium bioxalate

Identifiers
CAS Number	127-95-7
3D model (JSmol)	Interactive image
ChemSpider	29125
ECHA InfoCard	100.004.431
PubChem CID	31394
UNII	L3W2519LG2
CompTox Dashboard (EPA)	DTXSID6059572
- InChI: InChI=1S/C2H2O4.K/c3-1(4)2(5)6;/h(H,3,4)(H,5,6);/q;+1/p-1 Key: JMTCDHVHZSGGJA-UHFFFAOYSA-M; InChI=1/C2H2O4.K/c3-1(4)2(5)6;/h(H,3,4)(H,5,6);/q;+1/p-1 Key: JMTCDHVHZSGGJA-REWHXWOFAF
- SMILES: [K+].[O-]C(=O)C(=O)O

Properties
Chemical formula	C_{2}HKO_{4}
Molar mass	128.124 g·mol^{−1}
Appearance	White crystalline solid
Odor	odorless
Density	2.0 g/cm^{3}
Solubility in water	2.5 g/100 g
Solubility	slightly soluble in alcohol
- Except where otherwise noted, data are given for materials in their standard state (at 25 °C [77 °F], 100 kPa). verify (what is ?) Infobox references

Potassium hydrogenoxalate is a salt with formula KHC_{2}O_{4} or K^{+}·HO_{2}C-CO_{2}^{−}. It is one of the most common salts of the hydrogenoxalate anion, and can be obtained by reacting potassium hydroxide with oxalic acid in 1:1 mole ratio.

The salt is also known as: potassium hydrogen oxalate, potassium bioxalate, acid potassium oxalate, or monobasic potassium oxalate. In older literature, it was also called: Salt of sorrel, sorrel salt, sel d'oseille, sal acetosella; or, inaccurately, salt of lemon (due to the similar acidic “lemony” taste of the edible common sorrel or garden sorrel)

Potassium hydrogenoxalate occurs in some plants, notably sorrel. It is a commercial product used in photography, marble grinding, and removing ink stains.

== Properties ==
The anhydrous product is a white, odorless, crystalline solid, hygroscopic and soluble in water (2.5 g/100 g at room temperature). The solutions are basic. Below 50 °C the much less soluble "potassium tetraoxalate" K^{+}[C_{2}HO_{4}]^{−}·C_{2}H_{2}O_{4} forms and precipitates out of solution.

The monohydrate KHC_{2}O_{4}·H_{2}O starts losing the water at 100 °C.

The anhydrous salt was found to have remarkable elastic anisotropy, due to its crystal structure that consists of relatively rigid columns of hydrogen-bonded hydrogenoxalate anions, joined into sheets by ionic K–O bonds.

== Toxicity ==
Potassium hydrogenoxalate is strongly irritating to eyes, mucoses and gastrointestinal tract. It may cause cardiac failure and death.

== See also ==
- Potassium bicarbonate
- Potassium hydrogenacetylenedicarboxylate
