= Oxalyl-CoA decarboxylase =

oxalyl-CoA decarboxylase
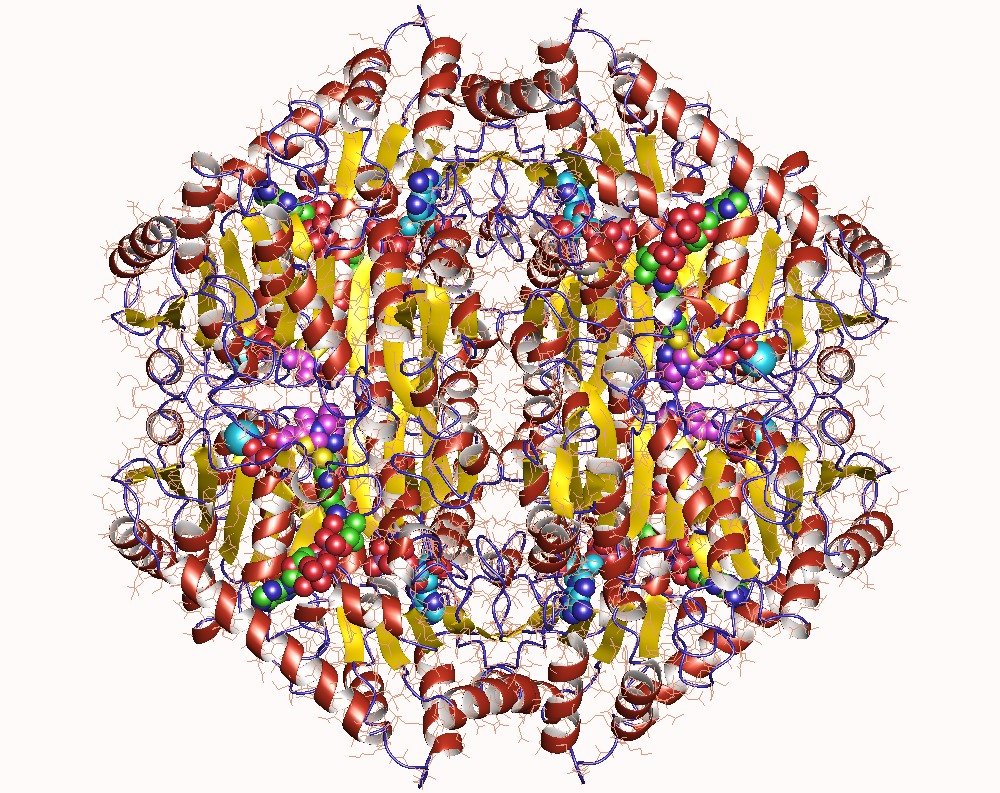
- Oxalyl-CoA decarboxylase homotetramer, Oxalobacter formigenes

Identifiers
- EC no.: 4.1.1.8
- CAS no.: 9024-96-8

Databases
- IntEnz: IntEnz view
- BRENDA: BRENDA entry
- ExPASy: NiceZyme view
- KEGG: KEGG entry
- MetaCyc: metabolic pathway
- PRIAM: profile
- PDB structures: RCSB PDB PDBe PDBsum
- Gene Ontology: AmiGO / QuickGO
Search
- PMC: articles
- PubMed: articles
- NCBI: proteins

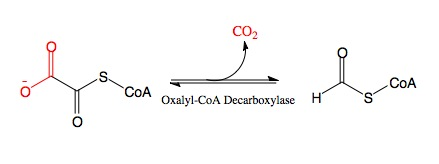

The enzyme oxalyl-CoA decarboxylase (OXC) (EC 4.1.1.8), primarily produced by the gastrointestinal bacterium Oxalobacter formigenes, catalyzes the chemical reaction

oxalyl-CoA $\rightleftharpoons$ formyl-CoA + CO_{2}

OXC belongs to the family of lyases, specifically the carboxy-lyases (decarboxylases), which cleave carbon-carbon bonds. The systematic name of this enzyme class is oxalyl-CoA carboxy-lyase (formyl-CoA-forming). Other names in common use include oxalyl coenzyme A decarboxylase, and oxalyl-CoA carboxy-lyase. This enzyme participates in glyoxylate and dicarboxylate metabolism. It employs one cofactor, thiamin diphosphate (TPP), and plays a key role in catabolism of oxalate, a highly toxic compound that is a product of the oxidation of carbohydrates in many bacteria and plants. Oxalyl-CoA decarboxylase is extremely important for the elimination of ingested oxalates found in human foodstuffs like coffee, tea, and chocolate, and the ingestion of such foods in the absence of Oxalobacter formigenes in the gut can result in kidney disease or even death as a result of oxalate poisoning.

== Evolution ==
Oxalyl-CoA decarboxylase is hypothesized to be evolutionarily related to acetolactate synthase, a TPP-dependent enzyme responsible for the biosynthesis of branched chain amino acids in certain organisms. Sequence alignments between the two enzymes support this claim, as do the presence of vestigial FAD-binding pockets that play no role in either enzyme's catalytic activity. The binding of FAD at this site in acetolactate synthase and the binding of ADP at a cognate site in OXC are thought to play roles in the stabilization of the tertiary structures of the proteins. No FAD binding is observed in oxalyl-CoA decarboxylase, but an excess of coenzyme A in the crystal structure has led to the hypothesis that the binding site was co-opted during OXC evolution to bind the CoA moiety of its substrate. Despite their similarities, only oxalyl-CoA decarboxylase is necessary for the formation of ATP in Oxalobacter formigenes, and exogenous ADP has been demonstrated to increase the decarboxylase activity of OXC, but not acetolactate synthase.

== Reaction mechanism ==
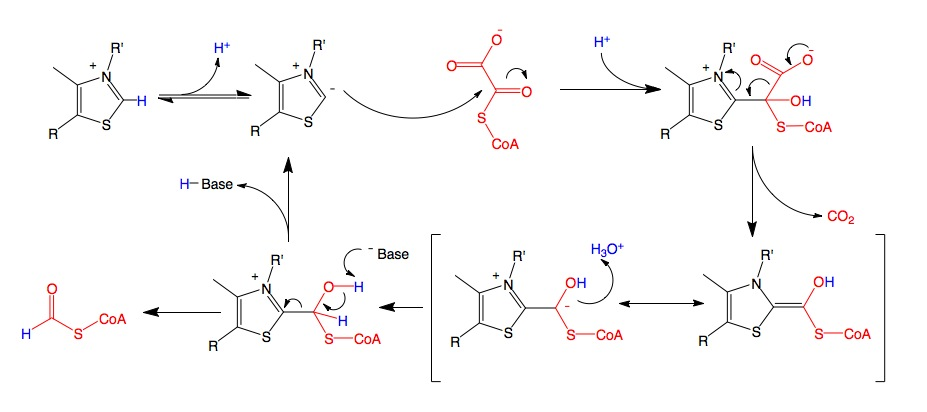
Simplified reaction mechanism of oxalyl-CoA decarboxylase. The unlabeled base is believed to be the 4'-imino group of TPP.

A key feature of the cofactor TPP is the relatively acidic proton bound to the carbon atom between the nitrogen and sulfur in the thiazole ring, which has a pKa near 10. This carbon center ionizes to form a carbanion, which adds to the carbonyl group of oxalyl-CoA. This addition is followed by the decarboxylation of oxalyl-CoA, and then the oxidation and removal of formyl-CoA to regenerate the carbanion form of TPP. While the reaction mechanism is shared with other TPP-dependent enzymes, the residues found in the active site of OXC are unique, which has raised questions about whether TDP must be deprotonated by a basic amino acid at a second site away from the carbanion-forming site to activate the cofactor.

== Structure ==
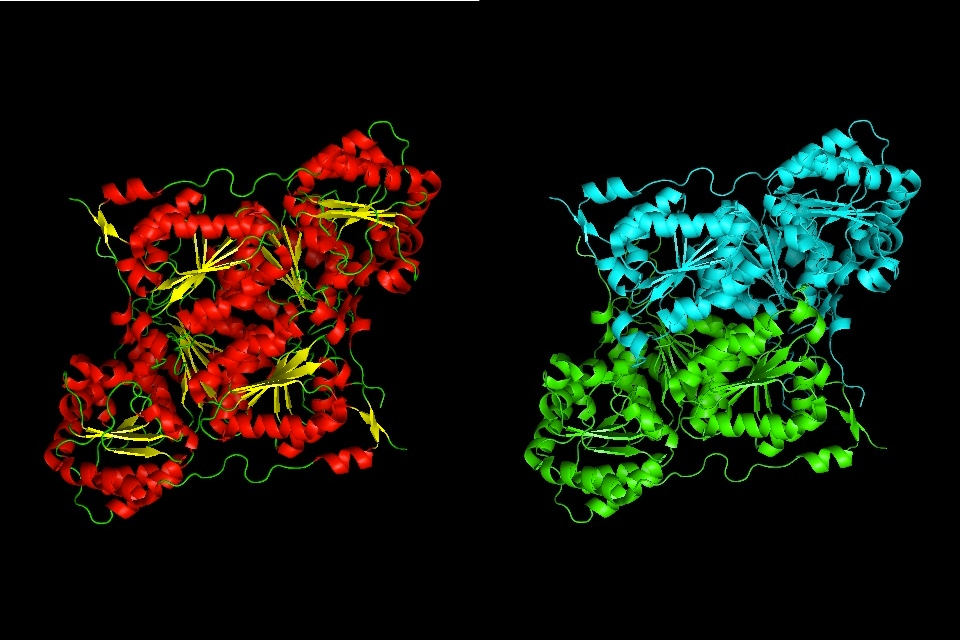
Two colorizations of the dimeric substructure of the enzyme. Left side distinguishes the enzyme's secondary structures and right side distinguishes the two monomers. Derived from 2JI6

Oxalyl-CoA decarboxylase is tetrameric, and each monomer consists of three α/β-type domains. The thiamine diphosphate-binding site rests on the subunit-subunit interface between two of the domains, which is commonly seen in its class of enzymes. Oxalyl-CoA decarboxylase is structurally homologous to acetolactate synthase found in plants and other microorganisms, but OXC binds ADP in a region that is similar to the FAD-binding site in acetolactate synthase.

== See also ==
- Oxalate—CoA ligase
- Formyl-CoA transferase
- Oxalate CoA-transferase
