= Formyl-CoA transferase =

InterPro Family

Identifiers
- EC no.: 2.8.3.16
- CAS no.: 128826-27-7

Databases
- BRENDA: enzyme data
- ExPASy: NiceZyme view
- KEGG: enzyme entry
- MetaCyc: metabolic pathway
- Rhea: reactions
- PDB structures: RCSB PDB PDBe PDBsum
Search
- PMC: articles
- PubMed: articles
- NCBI: proteins

Formyl-CoA transferase (EC 2.8.3.16) is an enzyme that catalyzes the chemical reaction

oxalic acid
+
formyl-CoA
oxalyl-CoA
+
formic acid

The two substrates of this enzyme characterised from Oxalobacter formigenes are oxalic acid and formyl-CoA. Its products are oxalyl-CoA and formic acid. The kinetics and mechanism of the reaction have been studied.

This enzyme is a transferase, specifically a CoA-transferases. The systematic name of this enzyme class is formyl-CoA:oxalate CoA-transferase. Other names in common use include formyl-coenzyme A transferase, and formyl-CoA oxalate CoA-transferase.

== Structural studies ==
As of late 2007, 4 structures have been solved for this class of enzymes, with PDB accession codes PDB: 1T3Z, PDB: 1T4C, PDB: 1VGQ, and PDB: 1VGR.
