= Oxalobacter formigenes =

Scientific classification
- Domain: Bacteria
- Kingdom: Pseudomonadati
- Phylum: Pseudomonadota
- Class: Betaproteobacteria
- Order: Burkholderiales
- Family: Oxalobacteraceae
- Genus: Oxalobacter
- Species: O. formigenes

Binomial name
- Oxalobacter formigenes Allison et al, 1985

Type strain
- Oxalobacter formigenes OxB^{T}

Species of bacterium

Oxalobacter formigenes is a Gram negative oxalate-degrading anaerobic bacterium that was first isolated from the gastrointestinal tract of a sheep in 1985. To date, the bacterium has been found to colonize the large intestines of numerous vertebrates, including humans, and has even been isolated from freshwater sediment. It processes oxalate by decarboxylation into formate (oxalyl-CoA decarboxylase), producing energy for itself in the process.

The broad-spectrum quinolone antibiotics kill O. formigenes. If a person's gastrointestinal (GI) tract lacks this bacterium, and therefore lacks the primary source of the oxalyl-CoA decarboxylase enzyme, then the GI tract cannot degrade dietary oxalates; after some vitamin B_{6}-modulated partial metabolic degradation in the body, the oxalates are excreted in the kidney, where they precipitates to form calcium oxalate kidney stones. Oxalobacter formigenes can protect against kidney stones by degrading oxalate.

The role and presence of O. formigenes in the human gut is an area of active research.

== Genome ==
Genomic information
- NCBI ID: 847
- Genome size: 2.41-2.47 Mb

The genome of O. formigenes has been sequenced by at least three different researchers. It has a G+C content of 49.6%.

== Taxonomy ==
Based on fatty acid profile, 16S ribosomal RNA sequencing, and DNA probes specific to the oxc (oxalyl-CoA decarboxylase) gene and frc (formyl-CoA transferase), O. formigenes has been divided into two groups. Group 1 has less diversity and better growth compared to group 2. To date, most research has focused on group 1 strains due to their ease of growth.

Interestingly, analysis with the DNA probes showed that group 2 may be further divided into two subgroups. Whole genome sequencing has revealed that the original O. formigenes taxon can be divided into three additional species: Oxalobacter aliiformigenes, Oxalobacter paeniformigenes, and Oxalobacter paraformigenes.

== Metabolism ==
O. formigenes uses oxalate as its primary carbon source. Oxalate is absorbed through an oxalate:formate antiporter (OxlT) in a 1:1 proportion. Imported oxalate is then converted to oxalyl-CoA via formyl-CoA transferase (frc). Oxalyl-CoA is decarboxylated using and H^{+} via oxalyl-CoA decarboxylase (oxc), releasing CO_{2}, and generating formyl-CoA, which is used for the frc reaction. In total, approximately 1 mol of formate and CO_{2} are produced per mol of oxalate consumed. 3H^{+} are imported via an ATPase to provide H^{+} for the decarboxylation reaction.

=== Cell biomass generation ===
Biomass in O. formigenes is primarily generated by oxalate consumption through the metabolism of oxalyl-CoA in the glycerate pathway. Acetate and carbonate are also used for cell biomass, but to a lesser extent than oxalate.

== Growth in culture ==
O. formigenes was isolated in oxalate-containing anerobic media. Currently, O. formigenes is grown in anaerobic Hungate tubes using a CO_{2}-bicarbonate buffered oxalate media. Optimal growth is achieved at a pH between 6 and 7. Oxalate is used at 20 mM for freezer recovery and general maintenance but concentrations can be increased to 100 mM for increased cell density. While oxalate is the main carbon source, small amounts of acetate and yeast extract are supportive of growth. O. formigenes can reach stationary phase in approximately 24 – 48 hours but is sometimes delayed to 72 hours.

Enriched anaerobic complex media (e.g. Brain heart infusion) fail to support the growth of O. formigenes unless supplemented with oxalate. Therefore, these media can be used to assess the purity of O. formigenes cultures.

== Antibiotic resistance and susceptibility ==
Given the fastidious nature of O. formigenes, traditional methods for antibiotic susceptibility testing are not sufficient. Instead, bacteria are cultured in the presence of antibiotics and screened for viability using opaque anaerobic oxalate agar. This method demonstrated that O. formigenes is resistant to nalidixic acid, ampicillin, amoxicillin, streptomycin, and vancomycin. O. formigenes was also found to be susceptible to ciprofloxacin, clarithromycin, clindamycin, doxycycline, gentamicin, levofloxacin, metronidazole, and tetracycline.

== Prevalence in the mammalian gut ==
O. formigenes is found in the mammalian gastrointestinal tract and often isolated from feces. In addition to culture-based methods, O. formigenes is presence is detected using molecular methods such as qPCR and next generation sequencing.

=== Humans ===
Humans are not typically born with O. formigenes and only become colonized when they begin crawling around in their environment. In adulthood, the frequency of O. formigenes in the gut microbiota varies across different populations. In North India, O. formigenes is prevalent in approximately 65% of the population. In South Korea and Japan, O. formigenes is present in about 75% of individuals. In the United States of America, O. formigenes is only detected in about 30% of the human population. Populations who do not practice modern medicine or life in a Western lifestyle typically have an increased prevalence of O. formigenes, which could imply that these practices affect O. formigenes colonization.

=== Ruminants ===
The idea that ruminants are colonized by oxalate-degrading bacteria came from the observation that sheep grazing on oxalate-rich plants (e.g. Halogeton glomeratus) consumed large quantities of this plant and died of renal intoxication from oxalate. However, by slowly acclimatizing sheep to high-oxalate intake, they would survive the consumption of large quantities of oxalate-rich plants. This led to the proposal that resident oxalate-degrading bacteria were enriched by the gradual introduction to an oxalate-rich diet, which protected the sheep from oxalate-induced renal damage. In 1980, the first oxalate-degrading bacteria were isolated from the rumen of sheep, and it was later named Oxalobacter formigenes.

== Clinical significance ==
O. formigenes has been investigated for its role in mitigating calcium oxalate kidney stone disease and primary hyperoxaluria because it metabolizes oxalate as its primary carbon source.

=== Oxalate degradation in kidney stone disease ===
In vitro experiments find that O. formigenes is a specialist oxalate-consuming bacterium that can degrade oxalate more efficiently than other generalist oxalate consuming bacteria. Initial research pointed to the loss of oxalate-degrading bacteria, such as O. formigenes, following antibiotic usage as primary contributor to calcium oxalate kidney stone disease. Colonization with O. formigenes has been observed to result in a decrease in urinary oxalate and reduced frequency of kidney stones.

Recent work using next-generation sequencing has found that O. formigenes colonizes both calcium oxalate kidney stone formers and non-stone-forming controls. This observation has led to the notion that O. formigenes alone may not be responsible for regulating oxalate degradation in the gut microbiota, but instead it may be part of a network of co-occurring bacterial taxa that modulate oxalate degradation together.

=== Secretagogues to promote intestinal oxalate dumping in kidney stone disease ===
It has been proposed that O. formigenes produces secretagogues that can stimulate oxalate transport in epithelial cells. While epithelial oxalate secretion has been shown in human cell lines and rodent models, it has not been confirmed in humans. Candidate bioactive molecules have been identified and tested in animal models.

=== O. formigenes as a therapeutic for primary hyperoxaluria ===
In a small study, oral supplementation with O. formigenes HC-1 along with a loading dose of oxalate resulted in reduced oxalate excretion during the 6 h immediately following ingestion. Multiple clinical trials in populations with primary hyperoxaluria have demonstrated that O. formigenes supplementation is safe and well tolerated but data are mixed on the capability of O. formigenes to establish in hosts and reduce urinary and plasma concentrations of oxalate.
