= Oxalic acid =

Simplest dicarboxylic acid. (COOH)2

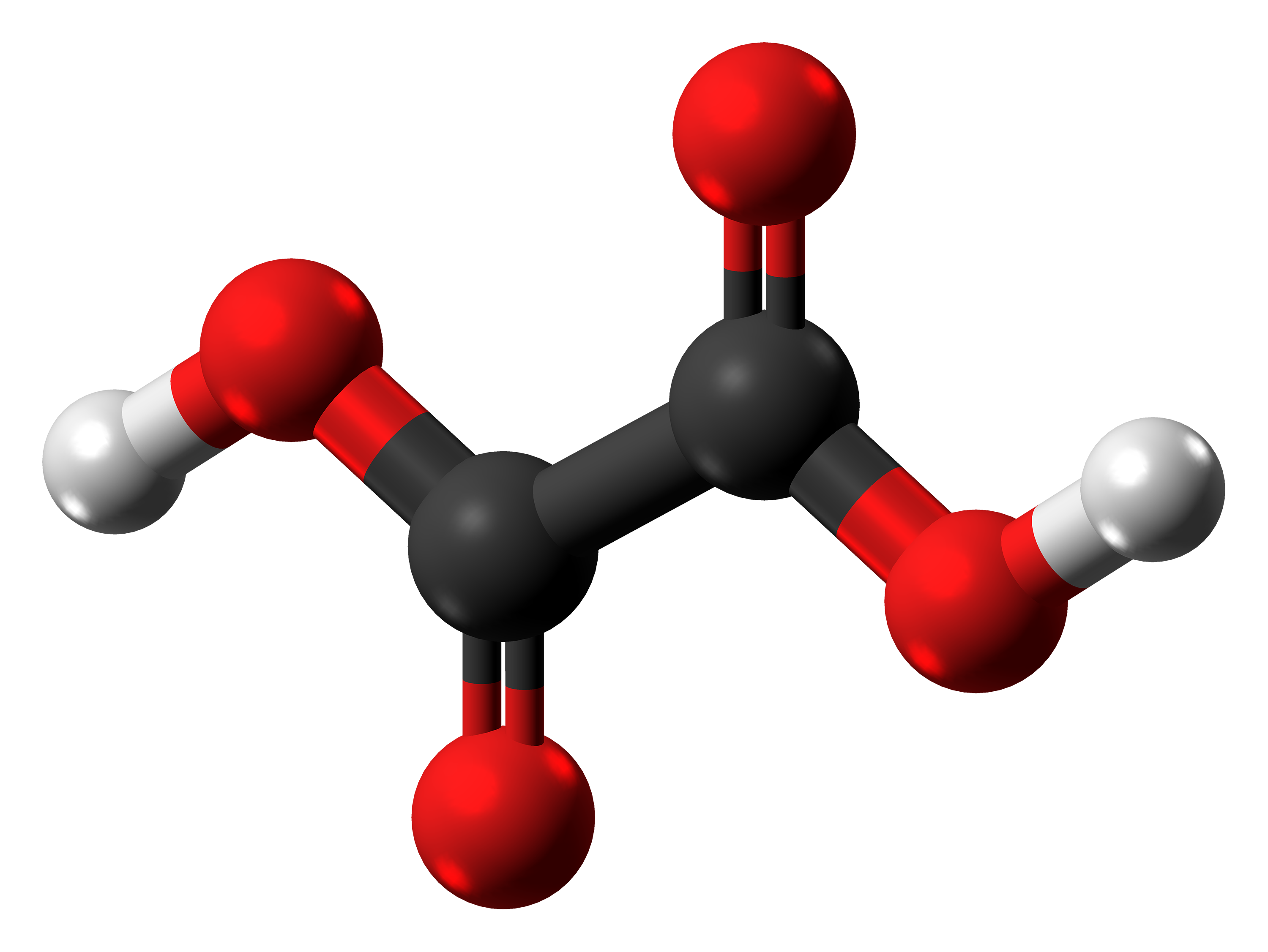

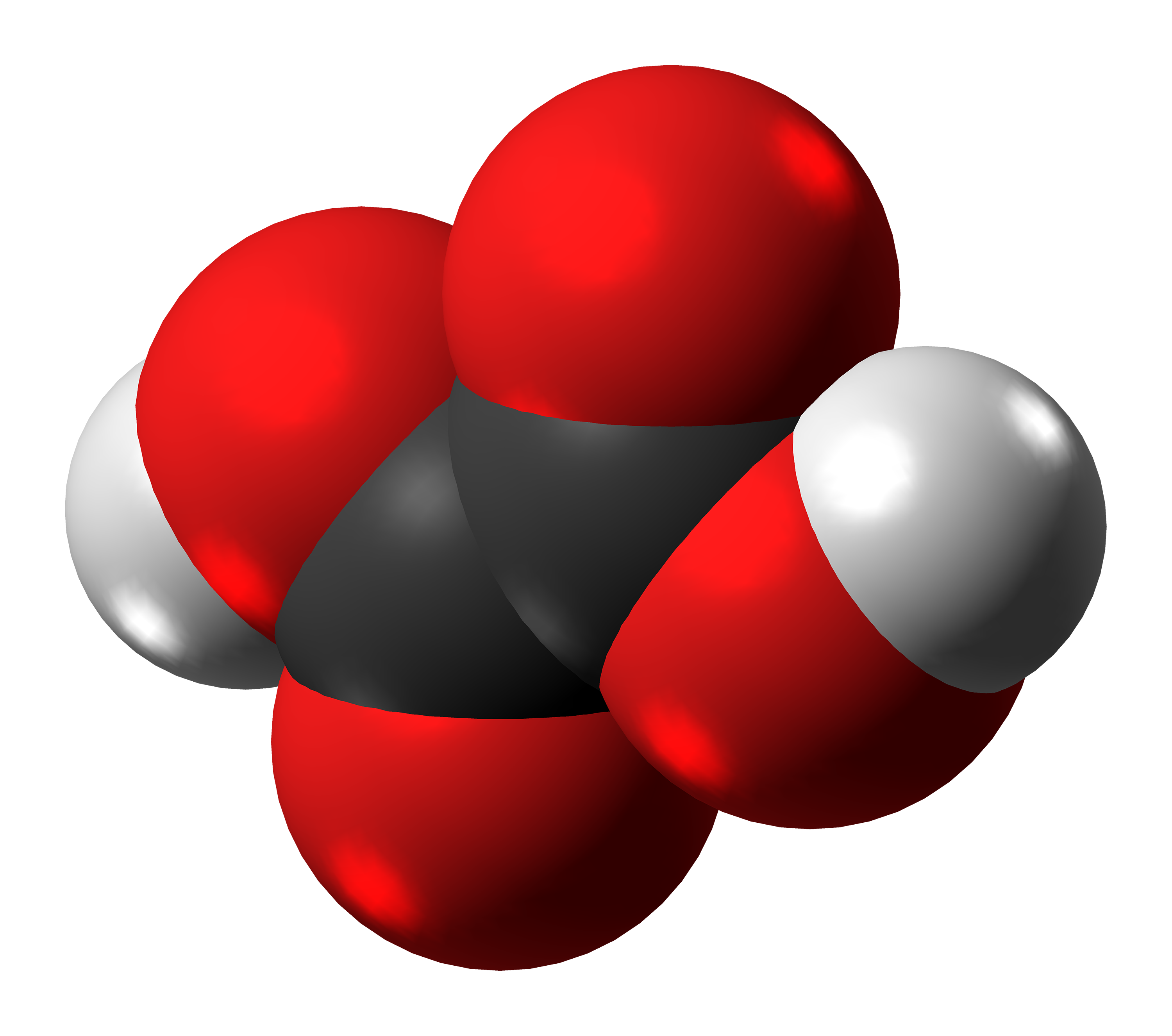

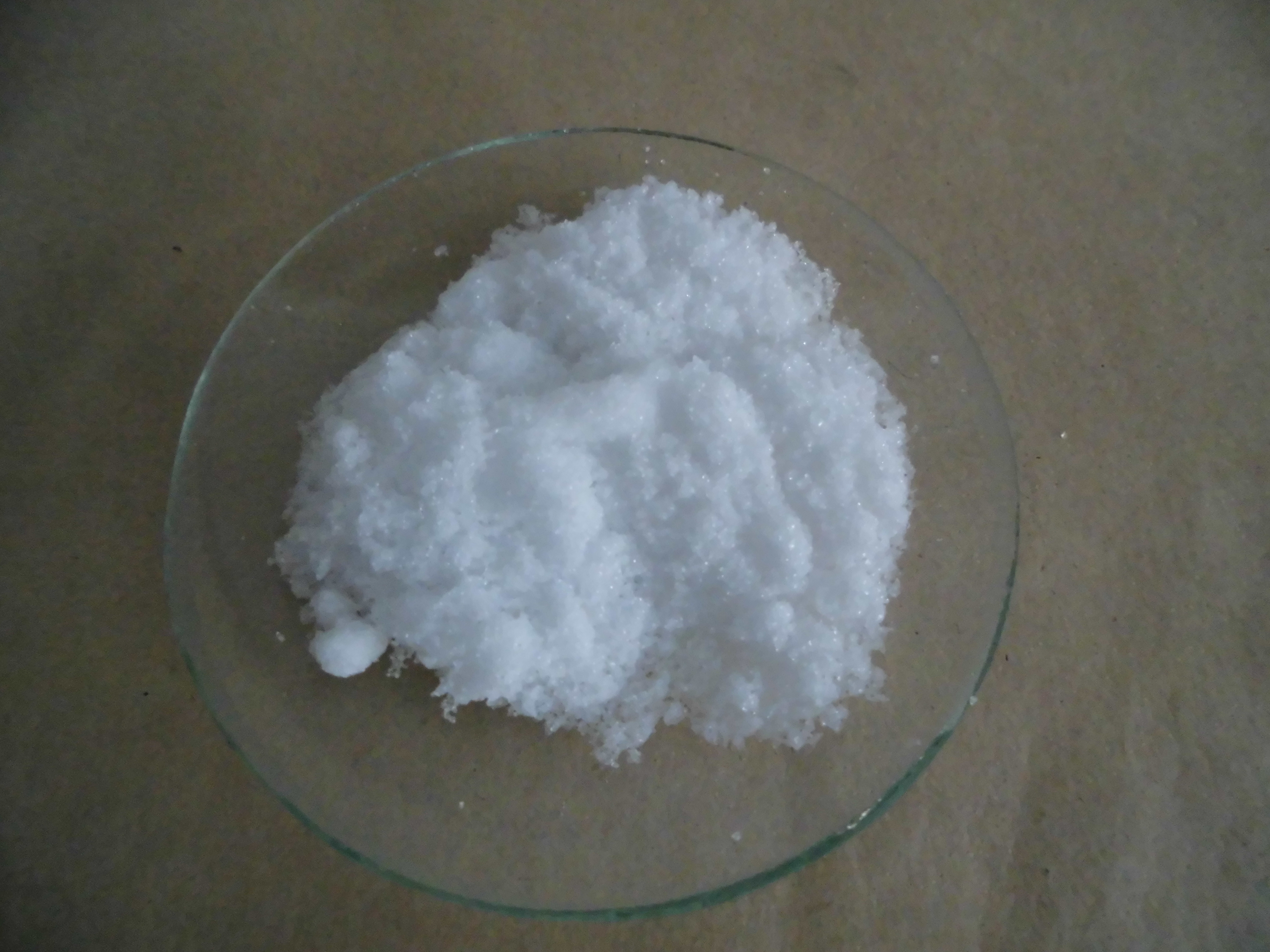
- Oxalic acid dihydrate Oxalic acid dihydrate

Names
- IUPAC name 1,2-ethanedioic acid
- Preferred IUPAC name Oxalic acid
- Systematic IUPAC name Ethanedioic acid
- Other names: Wood bleach; (Carboxyl)carboxylic acid; Carboxylformic acid; Dicarboxylic acid; Diformic acid

Identifiers
CAS Number	144-62-7 (anhydrous); 6153-56-6 (dihydrate)
3D model (JSmol)	Interactive image
Beilstein Reference	385686
ChEBI	CHEBI:16995
ChEMBL	ChEMBL146755
ChemSpider	946
DrugBank	DB03902
ECHA InfoCard	100.005.123
EC Number	205-634-3
Gmelin Reference	2208
KEGG	C00209
MeSH	Oxalic+acid
PubChem CID	971
RTECS number	RO2450000
UNII	9E7R5L6H31; 0K2L2IJ59O (dihydrate)
UN number	3261
CompTox Dashboard (EPA)	DTXSID0025816
- InChI: InChI=1S/C6H6O6/c3-1(4)2(5)6/h(H,3,4)(H,5,6) Key: MUBZPKHOEPUJKR-UHFFFAOYSA-N
- SMILES: OC(=O)C(=O)O

Properties
Chemical formula	C_{2}H_{2}O_{4}
Molar mass	90.034 g⋅mol^{−1} (anhydrous); 126.065 g⋅mol^{−1} (dihydrate)
Appearance	White crystals
Odor	Odorless
Density	1.90 g/cm^{3} (anhydrous, at 17 °C (63 °F)); 1.653 g/cm^{3} (dihydrate)
Melting point	189–191 °C (372–376 °F; 462–464 K) (anhydrous); 101.5 °C (214.7 °F; 374.6 K) (dihydrate)
Boiling point	decomposes (see article for details)
Solubility in water	46.9 g/L @ 5 °C (41 °F); 57.2 g/L @ 10 °C (50 °F); 75.5 g/L @ 15 °C (59 °F); 95.5 g/L @ 20 °C (68 °F); 118 g/L @ 25 °C (77 °F); 139 g/L @ 30 °C (86 °F); 178 g/L @ 35 °C (95 °F); 217 g/L @ 40 °C (104 °F); 261 g/L @ 45 °C (113 °F); 315 g/L @ 50 °C (122 °F); 376 g/L @ 55 °C (131 °F); 426 g/L @ 60 °C (140 °F); 548 g/L @ 65 °C (149 °F)
Solubility in ethanol	237 g/L @ 15 °C (59 °F)
Solubility in diethyl ether	14 g/L @ 15 °C (59 °F)
Vapor pressure	2.34×10^{−4} mmHg @ 20 °C (68 °F); 0.54 mmHg @ 105 °C (221 °F)
Acidity (pK_{a})	1.25 and 4.28
Conjugate base	Hydrogenoxalate
Magnetic susceptibility (χ)	−60.05×10^{−6} cm^{3}/mol

Thermochemistry
Heat capacity (C)	91.0 J/(mol·K)
Std molar entropy (S^{⦵}_{298})	109.8 J/(mol·K)
Std enthalpy of formation (Δ_{f}H^{⦵}_{298})	−829.9 kJ/mol

Pharmacology
ATCvet code	QP53AG03 (WHO)

Hazards
- Occupational safety and health (OHS/OSH)
Main hazards	Corrosive
- GHS labelling
Pictograms	(GHS05: Corrosive) (GHS07: Exclamation mark) (GHS08: Health hazard)
Signal word	Danger
Hazard statements	H302+H312, H318, H402
Precautionary statements	P264, P270, P273, P280, P301+P312+P330, P302+P352+P312, P305+P351+P338+P310, P362+P364, P501
NFPA 704 (fire diamond)	3 1 0 ACID
Flash point	166 °C (331 °F; 439 K)
- Lethal dose or concentration (LD, LC)
LD_{Lo} (lowest published)	1000 mg/kg (dog, oral); 1400 mg/kg (rat); 7500 mg/kg (rat, oral)
- NIOSH (US health exposure limits):NIOSH Pocket Guide to Chemical Hazards. "#0474". National Institute for Occupational Safety and Health (NIOSH).
PEL (Permissible)	TWA 1 mg/m^{3}
REL (Recommended)	TWA 1 mg/m^{3}; ST 2 mg/m^{3}
IDLH (Immediate danger)	500 mg/m^{3}
Safety data sheet (SDS)	External MSDS

Related compounds
Related compounds	oxalyl chloride; disodium oxalate; calcium oxalate; phenyl oxalate ester
- Except where otherwise noted, data are given for materials in their standard state (at 25 °C [77 °F], 100 kPa). verify (what is ?) Infobox references

Oxalic acid is an organic acid with the systematic name ethanedioic acid and chemical formula HO−C(=O)−C(=O)−OH, also written as (COOH)_{2} or (CO_{2}H)_{2} or H_{2}C_{2}O_{4}. It is the simplest dicarboxylic acid. It is a white crystalline solid that forms a colorless solution in water. Its name is derived from early investigators who isolated oxalic acid from flowering plants of the genus Oxalis, commonly known as wood-sorrels. It occurs naturally in many foods. It can be toxic when ingested in significant quantities, and contact with concentrated forms can cause chemical burns.

Oxalic acid is a much stronger acid than acetic acid. It is a reducing agent and its conjugate bases hydrogenoxalate (HC_{2}O_{4}^{−}) and oxalate (C_{2}O_{4}^{2−}) are chelating agents for metal cations. It is used as a cleaning agent, especially for the removal of rust, because it forms a water-soluble ferric iron complex, the ferrioxalate ion. Oxalic acid typically occurs as the dihydrate with the formula H_{2}C_{2}O_{4}·2H_{2}O.

== History ==
The preparation of salts of oxalic acid from plants had been known since at least 1745, when the Dutch botanist and physician Herman Boerhaave isolated a salt from wood sorrel, akin to kraft process. By 1773, François Pierre Savary of Fribourg, Switzerland had isolated oxalic acid from its salt in sorrel.

In 1776, Swedish chemists Carl Wilhelm Scheele and Torbern Olof Bergman produced oxalic acid by reacting sugar with concentrated nitric acid; Scheele called the acid that resulted socker-syra or såcker-syra (sugar acid). By 1784, Scheele had shown that "sugar acid" and oxalic acid from natural sources were identical. The modern name was introduced (along with many other acid names) in 1787, by de Morveau, Lavoisier and co-authors.

In 1824, the German chemist Friedrich Wöhler obtained oxalic acid by reacting cyanogen with ammonia in aqueous solution. This experiment may represent the first synthesis of a natural product.

== Production ==
=== Industrial ===
Oxalic acid is mainly manufactured by the oxidation of carbohydrates like glucose using nitric acid or air in the presence of vanadium pentoxide. Another process uses oxygen to regenerate the nitric acid, using a variety of precursors including glycolic acid and ethylene glycol. As of 2011, this process was only used by Mitsubishi in Japan. A newer method entails oxidative carbonylation of alcohols to give the diesters of oxalic acid:

4 ROH + 4 CO + O_{2} → 2 (CO_{2}R)_{2} + 2 H_{2}O

These diesters are subsequently hydrolyzed to oxalic acid. Approximately 120,000 tonnes are produced annually.

Historically oxalic acid was obtained exclusively by using caustics, such as sodium or potassium hydroxide, on sawdust, followed by acidification of the oxalate by mineral acids, such as sulfuric acid. Oxalic acid can also be formed by the heating of sodium formate in the presence of an alkaline catalyst.

=== Laboratory ===
Although it can be readily purchased, oxalic acid can be prepared in the laboratory by oxidizing sucrose using nitric acid in the presence of a small amount of vanadium pentoxide as a catalyst.

The dihydrate can be converted to the anhydrous form by heating or azeotropic distillation.

== Structure ==
=== Anhydrous ===
Anhydrous oxalic acid exists as two polymorphs; in one the hydrogen-bonding results in a chain-like structure, whereas the hydrogen bonding pattern in the other form defines a sheet-like structure. Because the anhydrous material is both acidic and hydrophilic (water seeking), it is used in esterifications.

=== Dihydrate ===
The dihydrate H_{2}C_{2}O_{4}·2H_{2}O has space group C^{5}_{2h}–P2_{1}/n, with lattice parameters a = 611.9 pm, b = 360.7 pm, c = 1205.7 pm, β = 106°19′, Z = 2. The main inter-atomic distances are: C−C 153 pm, C−O_{1} 129 pm, C−O_{2} 119 pm.

== Reactions ==
=== Acid–base properties ===
Oxalic acid's pK_{a} values vary in the literature from 1.25 to 1.46 and from 3.81 to 4.40. The 100th ed of the CRC, released in 2019, has values of 1.25 and 3.81. Oxalic acid is relatively strong compared to other carboxylic acids:

H_{2}C_{2}O_{4} ⇌ HC_{2}O_{4}^{−} + H^{+}	pK_{a1} = 1.27
HC_{2}O_{4}^{−} ⇌ C_{2}O_{4}^{2−} + H^{+}	pK_{a2} = 4.27

Oxalic acid undergoes many of the reactions characteristic for other carboxylic acids. It forms esters such as dimethyl oxalate (m.p. 52.5 to 53.5 °C, 126.5 to 128.3 °F). It forms an acid chloride called oxalyl chloride.

=== Metal-binding properties ===
Transition metal oxalate complexes are numerous, e.g. the drug oxaliplatin. Oxalic acid has been shown to reduce manganese dioxide (MnO_{2}) in manganese ores to allow the leaching of the metal by sulfuric acid.

Oxalic acid is an important reagent in lanthanide chemistry. Hydrated lanthanide oxalates form readily in very strongly acidic solutions as a densely crystalline, easily filtered form, largely free of contamination by nonlanthanide elements:

2 Ln^{3+} + 3 H_{2}C_{2}O_{4} → Ln_{2}(C_{2}O_{4})_{3} + 6 H^{+}

Thermal decomposition of these oxalates gives the oxides, which is the most commonly marketed form of these elements.

=== Other ===
Oxalic acid and oxalates can be oxidized by permanganate ion in an autocatalytic reaction.

Oxalic acid vapor decomposes at 125–175 °C (257–347 °F) to CO_{2} and formic acid (HCOOH). Photolysis with 237–313 nm UV light also produces carbon monoxide (CO) and water.

Evaporation of a solution of urea and oxalic acid in 2:1 molar ratio yields a solid crystalline compound H_{2}C_{2}O_{4}·2CO(NH_{2})_{2}, consisting of stacked two-dimensional networks of the neutral molecules held together by hydrogen bonds with the oxygen atoms.

== Occurrence ==
=== Biosynthesis ===
At least two pathways exist for the enzyme-mediated formation of oxalate. In one pathway, oxaloacetate, a component of the Krebs citric acid cycle, is hydrolyzed to oxalate and acetic acid by the enzyme oxaloacetase:

[O_{2}CC(O)CH_{2}CO_{2}]^{2−} + H_{2}O → C_{2}O_{4}^{2−} + CH_{3}CO_{2}^{−} + H^{+}

It also arises from the dehydrogenation of glycolic acid, which is produced by the metabolism of ethylene glycol.

=== Occurrence in foods and plants ===
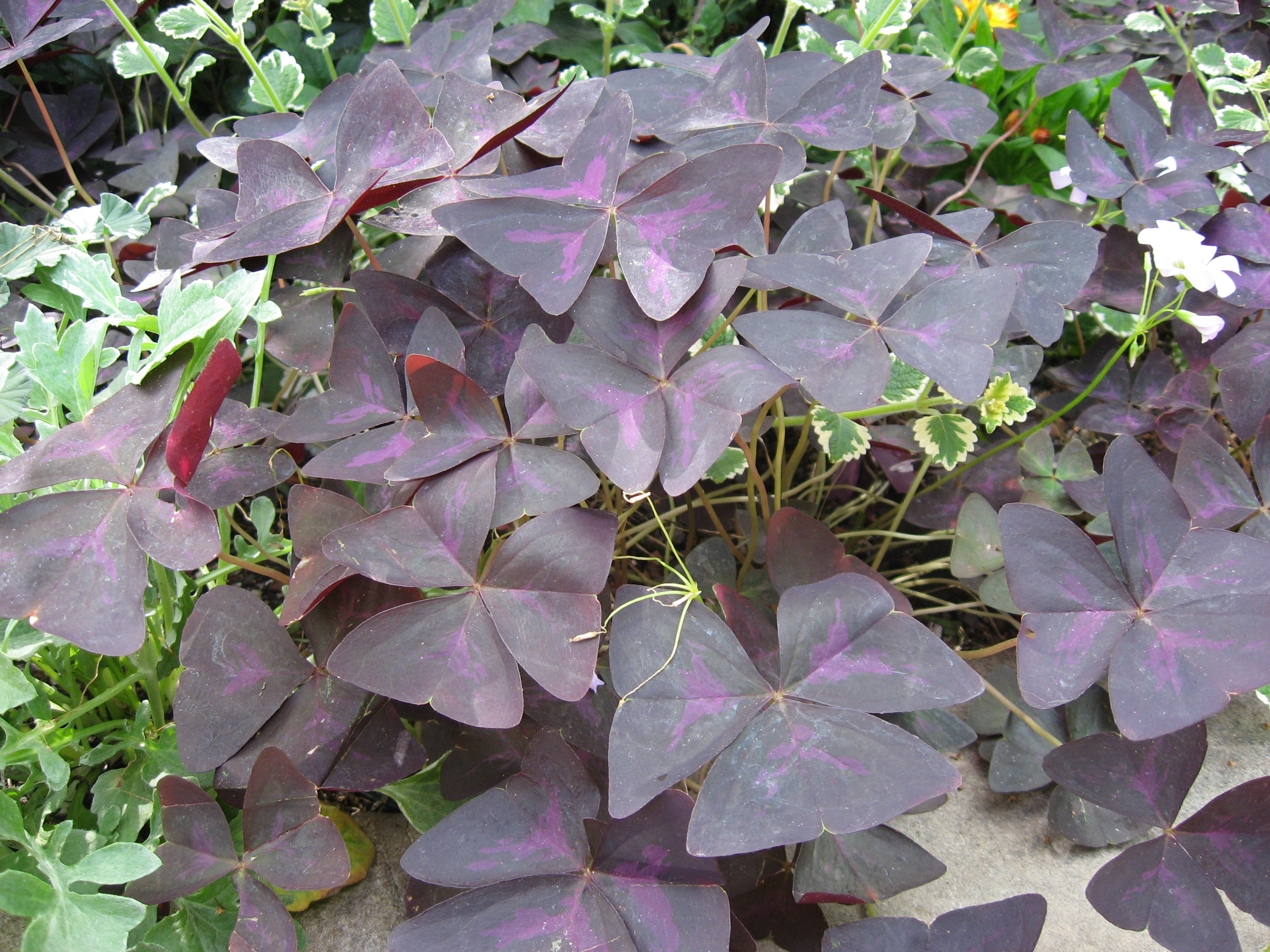
Stems of Oxalis triangularis contain oxalic acid.

Early investigators isolated oxalic acid from wood-sorrel (Oxalis). Members of the spinach family and the brassicas (cabbage, broccoli, brussels sprouts) are high in oxalates, as are sorrel and umbellifers like parsley. The leaves and stems of all species of the genus Chenopodium and related genera of the family Amaranthaceae, which includes quinoa, contain high levels of oxalic acid. Rhubarb leaves contain about 0.5% oxalic acid, and jack-in-the-pulpit (Arisaema triphyllum) contains calcium oxalate crystals. Similarly, the Virginia creeper, a common decorative vine, produces oxalic acid in its berries as well as oxalate crystals in the sap, in the form of raphides. Bacteria produce oxalates from oxidation of carbohydrates.

Plants of the genus Fenestraria produce optical fibers made from crystalline oxalic acid to transmit light to subterranean photosynthetic sites.

Carambola, also known as starfruit, also contains oxalic acid along with caramboxin. Citrus juice contains small amounts of oxalic acid.

The formation of naturally occurring calcium oxalate patinas on certain limestone and marble statues and monuments has been proposed to be caused by the chemical reaction of the carbonate stone with oxalic acid secreted by lichen or other microorganisms.

=== Production by fungi ===
Many soil fungus species secrete oxalic acid, which results in greater solubility of metal cations and increased availability of certain soil nutrients, and can lead to the formation of calcium oxalate crystals. Some fungi such as Aspergillus niger have been extensively studied for the industrial production of oxalic acid; however, those processes are not yet economically competitive with production from oil and gas. Cryphonectria parasitica may excrete oxalic-acid-containing solutions at the advancing edge of its chestnut cambium infection. The lower pH (<2.5) of more concentrated oxalic acid excretions may degrade cambium cell walls and have a toxic effect on chestnut cambium cells. Cambium cells that burst provide nutrients for a blight infection advance.

== Biochemistry ==
The conjugate base of oxalic acid is the hydrogenoxalate anion, and its conjugate base (oxalate) is a competitive inhibitor of the lactate dehydrogenase (LDH) enzyme. LDH catalyses the conversion of pyruvate to lactic acid (end product of the fermentation (anaerobic) process) oxidising the coenzyme NADH to NAD^{+} and H^{+} concurrently. Restoring NAD^{+} levels is essential to the continuation of anaerobic energy metabolism through glycolysis. As cancer cells preferentially use anaerobic metabolism (see Warburg effect) inhibition of LDH has been shown to inhibit tumor formation and growth, thus is an interesting potential course of cancer treatment.

Oxalic acid plays a key role in the interaction between pathogenic fungi and plants. Small amounts of oxalic acid enhances plant resistance to fungi, but higher amounts cause widespread programmed cell death of the plant and help with fungi infection. Plants normally produce it in small amounts, but some pathogenic fungi such as Sclerotinia sclerotiorum cause a toxic accumulation.

Oxalate, besides being biosynthesised, may also be biodegraded. Oxalobacter formigenes is an important gut bacterium that helps animals (including humans) degrade oxalate.

== Applications ==
Oxalic acid's main applications include cleaning or bleaching, especially for the removal of rust (iron complexing agent). It is the primary active ingredient in Bar Keepers Friend brand cleaner. Its utility in rust removal agents is due to its forming a stable, water-soluble salt with ferric iron, ferrioxalate ion.

Oxalic acid is an ingredient in some tooth whitening products. About 25% of produced oxalic acid is used as a mordant in dyeing processes. It is also used in bleaches, especially for pulpwood, cork, straw, cane, feathers, and for rust removal and other cleaning, in baking powder, and as a third reagent in silica analysis instruments.

=== Niche uses ===
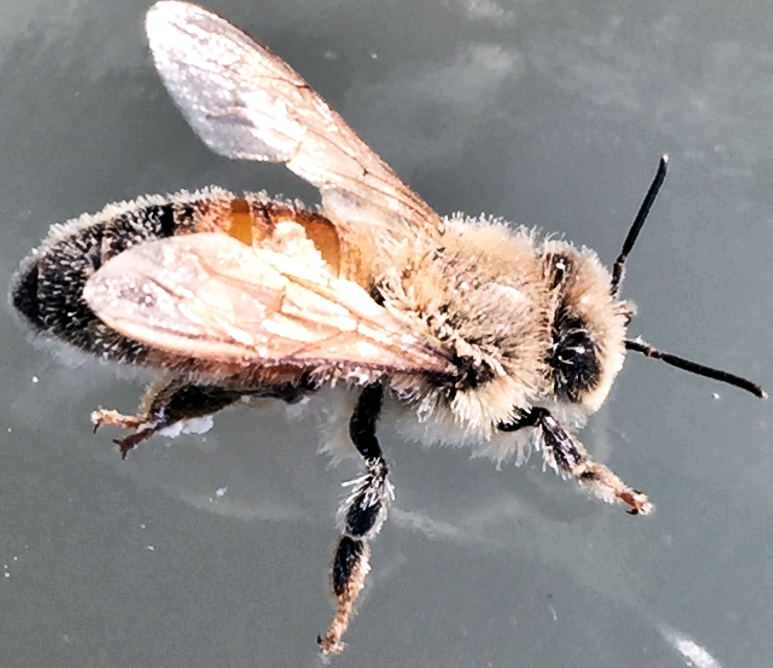
Honeybee coated with oxalate crystals

Some beekeepers use oxalic acid as a miticide against the parasitic varroa mite.

Dilute solutions (0.05–0.15 M) of oxalic acid can be used to remove iron from clays such as kaolinite to produce light-colored ceramics.

Oxalic acid can be used to clean minerals like many other acids. Two such examples are quartz crystals and pyrite.

Oxalic acid is sometimes used in the aluminum anodizing process, with or without sulfuric acid. Compared to sulfuric-acid anodizing, the coatings obtained are thinner and exhibit lower surface roughness.

Oxalic acid is also widely used as a wood bleach; most often it is supplied in its crystalline form, so as to be mixed with water to its proper dilution for use.

=== Semiconductor industry ===
Oxalic acid is also used in electronic and semiconductor industries. In 2006 it was reported being used in electrochemical–mechanical planarization of copper layers in the semiconductor devices fabrication process.

=== Proposed uses ===
Reduction of carbon dioxide to oxalic acid by various methods, such as electrocatalysis using a copper complex, is under study as a proposed chemical intermediate for carbon capture and utilization.

== Content in food items ==
Vegetable	Content of oxalic acid (%)^{a}
Amaranth	1.09
Asparagus	0.13
Beans, snap	0.36
Beet leaves	0.61
Beetroot	0.06
Broccoli	0.19
Brussels sprouts	0.02
Cabbage	0.10
Carrot	0.50
Cassava	1.26
Cauliflower	0.15
Celery	0.19
Chicory	0.2
Chives	1.48
Collards	0.45
Coriander	0.01
Corn, sweet	0.01
Cucumber	0.02
Eggplant	0.19
Endive	0.11
Garlic	0.36
Kale	0.02
Lettuce	0.33
Okra	0.05
Onion	0.05
Parsley	1.70
Parsnip	0.04
Pea	0.05
Bell pepper	0.04
Potato	0.05
Purslane	1.31
Radish	0.48
Rhubarb leaves	0.52
Rutabaga	0.03
Spinach	0.97 (ranges from 0.65% to 1.3% on fresh weight basis)
Squash	0.02
Sweet potato	0.24
Swiss chard, green	0.96
Tomato	0.05
Turnip	0.21
Turnip greens	0.05
Watercress	0.31

== Toxicity ==
Oxalic acid has an oral LD_{Lo} (lowest published lethal dose) of 600 mg/kg. It has been reported that the lethal oral dose is 15 to 30 grams. The toxicity of oxalic acid is due to kidney failure caused by precipitation of solid calcium oxalate.

Oxalate is known to cause mitochondrial dysfunction.

Ingestion of ethylene glycol results in oxalic acid as a metabolite which can also cause acute kidney failure.

== Notes ==
^aUnless otherwise cited, all measurements are based on raw vegetable weights with original moisture content.

== See also ==
- Oxalis acetosella
- Potassium hydrogenoxalate
