= Coenraad Johannes van Houten =

Dutch businessman (1801–1887)

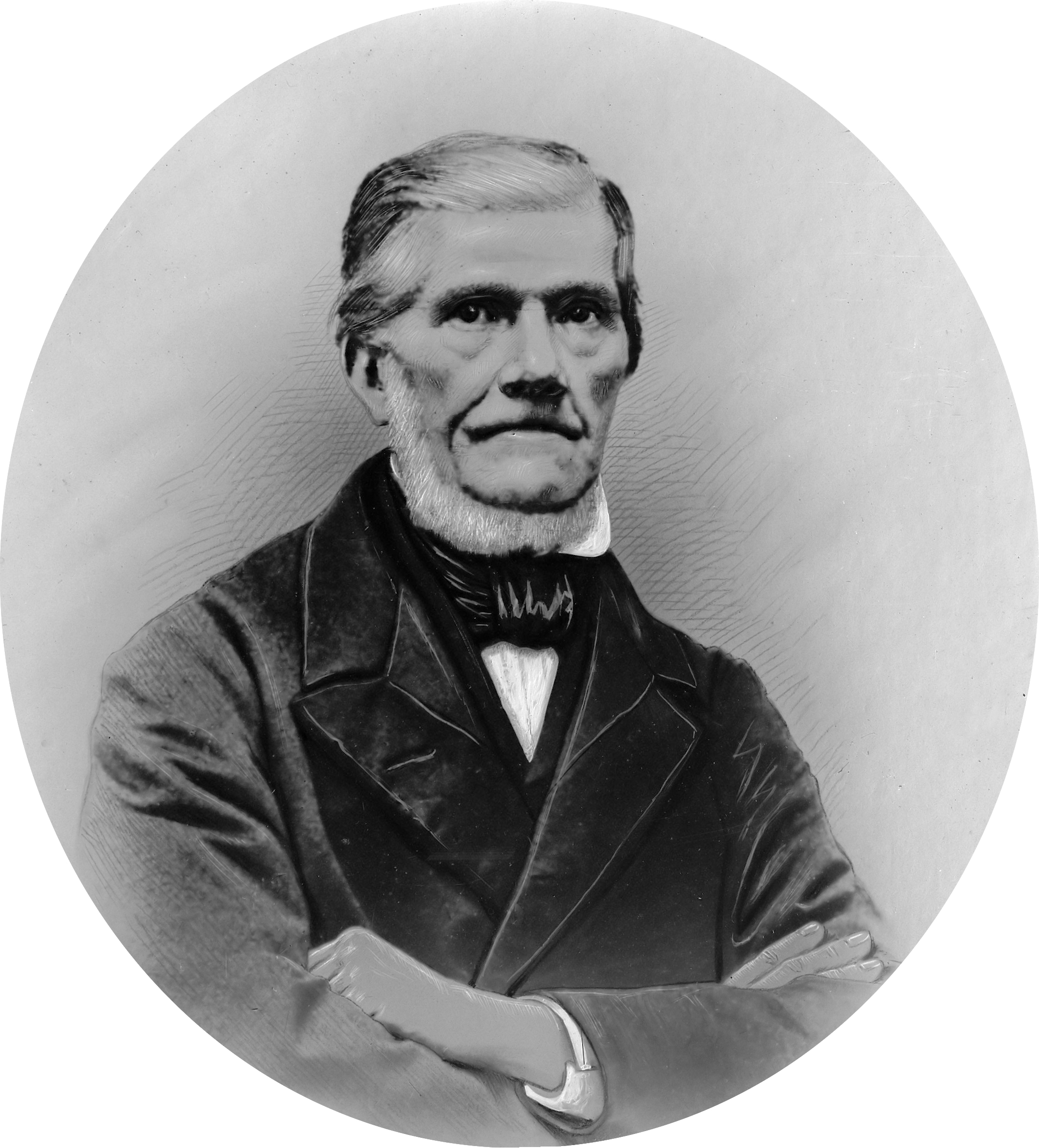
- Portrait of Coenraad Johannes van Houten
- Born: 15 March 1801; Amsterdam, Batavian Republic
- Died: 27 May 1887 (aged 86); Weesp, Netherlands

Coenraad Johannes van Houten (15 March 1801 – 27 May 1887) was a Dutch chemist and chocolate maker known for the treatment of cocoa mass with alkaline salts to remove the bitter taste and make defatted cocoa more water-soluble; the resulting product is still called "Dutch process chocolate". He has also been credited with introducing a method for pressing the fat (cocoa butter) from roasted cocoa beans, though this was in fact his father Casparus van Houten's invention.

== Father and son van Houten ==
Coenraad Johannes van Houten was the son of Casparus van Houten (1770–1858) and Arnoldina Koster. His father opened a chocolate factory in Amsterdam in 1815, with a mill turned by laborers. At that time, cocoa beans were ground into a fine mass, which could then be mixed with milk to create a chocolate drink or, with addition of sugar, cinnamon, and vanilla, made into cookies.

== Cocoa press ==
In 1828, Casparus van Houten Sr. (and not his son, who is usually credited) patented a method for pressing the fat from roasted cocoa beans. The center of the bean, known as the "nib", contains an average of 54% of cocoa butter, which is a natural fat. Van Houten's machine – a hydraulic press – reduced the cocoa butter content of cocoa liquor by nearly half. On one side this created a "cake" that could be pulverized into cocoa powder. On the other side this allowed the production of pure cocoa butter. The cocoa powder could be used for less fatty drinking chocolate and the cocoa butter for improved eating chocolate. This was to become the base of the modern chocolate industry.

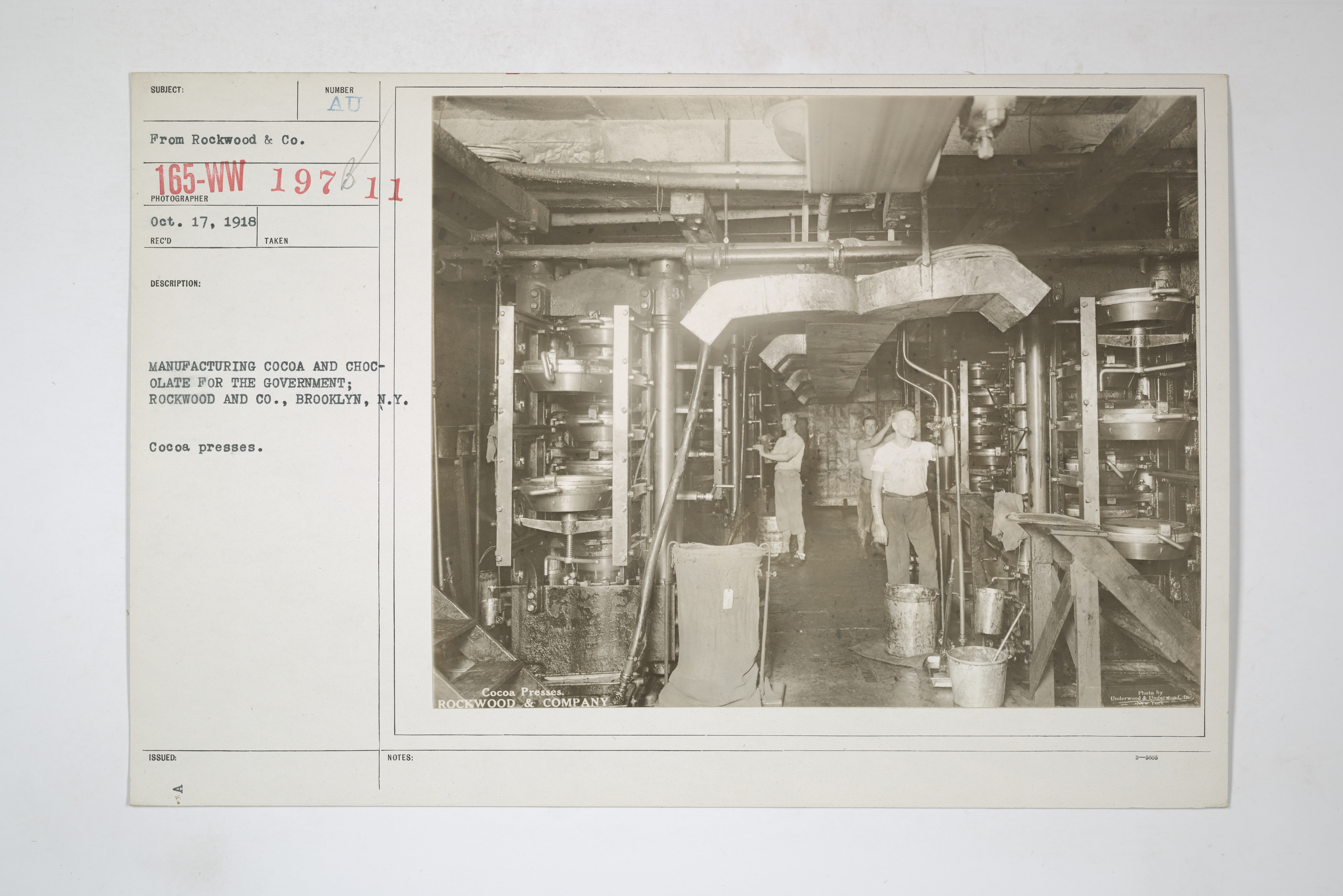
Cocoa presses being operated in the early 20th century

However, it is not before the late 1860s that the Van Houten press began to be employed by chocolate manufacturers outside the Netherlands. Earlier than that, less efficient but less expensive ways to extract cocoa butter (and defat cocoa) were still used, such as small hydraulic presses, or the Broma process by Ghirardelli. Moreover, cocoa for drinking was often mixed with starches, such as arrowroot, to soak up the extra fat. The consumption of eating chocolate soared in the 1870s, therefore creating a demand for cocoa butter, which came to be traded internationally.

=== Dutch process chocolate ===
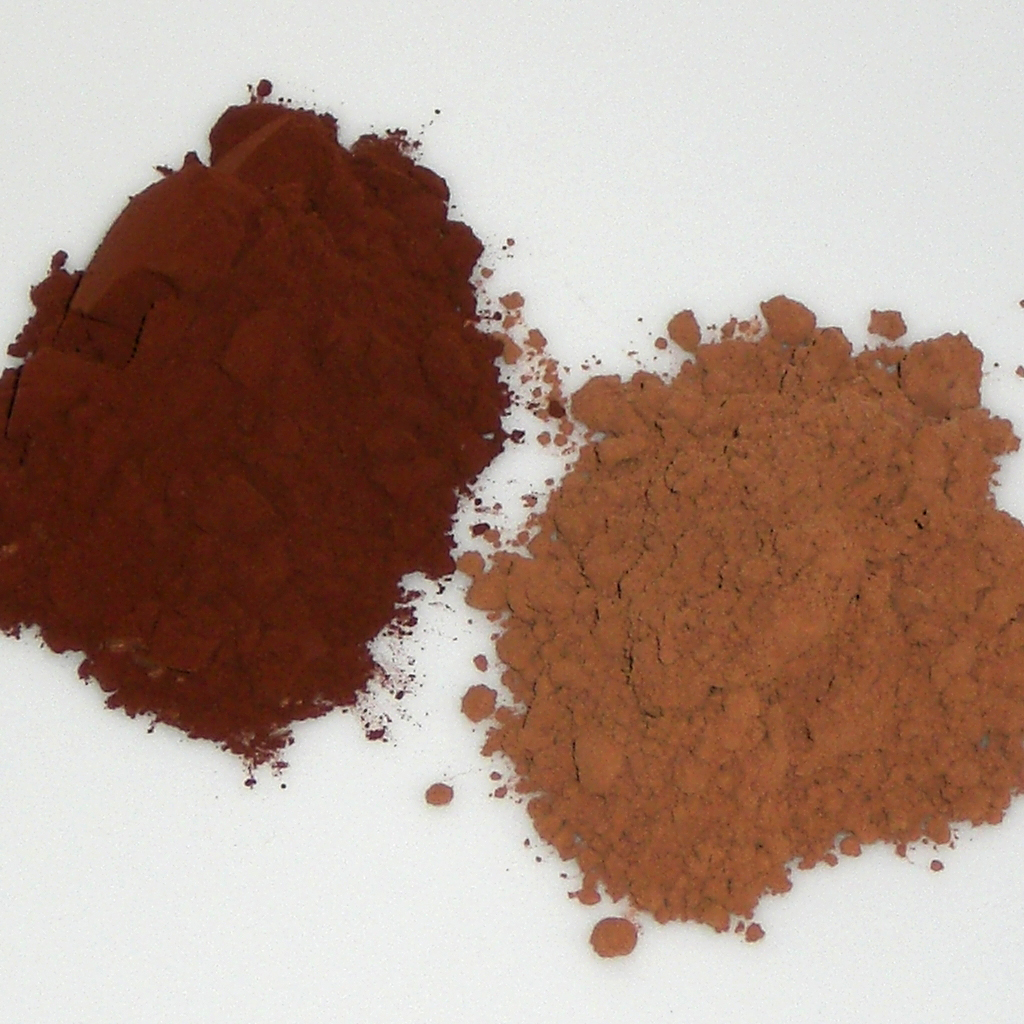
Dutch process cocoa (left) compared to natural cocoa (right)

Coenraad Van Houten introduced a further improvement by treating the powder with alkaline salts (potassium or sodium carbonates) so that the powder would mix more easily with water. Today, this process is known as "Dutching". The final product, Dutch chocolate, has a dark color and a mild taste.

=== Later career ===
In 1835, Coenraad Johannes van Houten married Hermina van Houten (unrelated) from Groningen. In 1850, he moved his production from a windmill in Leiden to a steam factory in Weesp. By that time he was exporting chocolate to England, France, and Germany. In 1866, John Cadbury traveled to Weesp to buy a Van Houten press, but did not use it in his manufacturing until 1875.

Coenraad's son Casparus Johannes (1844–1901), employed since 1865, had a gift for marketing and contributed greatly to the growth of the company. Advertisements for Van Houten could be found on trams throughout Europe and the United States. As early as 1899, Van Houten produced a commercial film that depicted a sleepy clerk who recovers miraculously after eating some chocolate. The factory was a boost for the town of Weesp, whose population doubled in the second half of the 19th century. Casparus Jr. had himself built a 99-room Jugendstil villa in Weesp, by the renowned architect Abraham Salm (1857–1915). Work was started in 1897 but not completed until 1901, the year he died.

The Van Houten company was sold in 1962 to W.R. Grace, and the factories in Weesp closed in 1971. The Van Houten brand name, still in use, has been transferred several times since, in 1990 from the German chocolate manufacturer Jacobs Suchard to Philip Morris. It subsequently was owned by the Stollwerck chocolate manufacturing company and since 2002 by Barry Callebaut.

== The legacy of Dutch process cocoa ==
Dutch process cocoa is generally acknowledged as superior to cocoa not processed in this way. The combination of the inventions by father and son van Houten led to the nineteenth-century mass production and consumption of chocolate, or, as some call it, the "democratization" of chocolate.

== Popular culture ==
"Drink Van Houten's Cocoa!" wrote Vladimir Mayakovsky in his poem, A Cloud in Trousers, referencing an urban legend about a publicity trick by Van Houten company: paying a condemned man to shout their slogan directly before being hanged. This infamous citation is the title of Ornela Vorpsi's book from 2010.

A Van Houten's Cocoa shop can be seen during the opening battle sequence of Neil Jordan's 1996 film Michael Collins.
