= Dutch process =

Dutch process may refer to:

- Dutch process cocoa
- a method of making white lead
