= C. J. van Houten =

C. J. van Houten may refer to:

- Coenraad Johannes van Houten, inventor of the cocoa press
- Cornelis Johannes van Houten, Dutch astronomer and prolific discoverer of asteroids
