= Broma process =

Method of extracting cocoa butter from cocoa beans

In chocolate making, the Broma process is a method of extracting cocoa butter from roasted cocoa beans, credited to an employee working for the chocolatier Domingo Ghirardelli. The Broma process involves hanging bags of chocolate liquor, made from roasted and ground cocoa beans, in a very warm room, above the melting point of cocoa butter (slightly above room temperature), and allowing the butter to drip off the bags, where it is collected. The Dutch process adds an extra processing step to the Broma process whereby, after the cocoa butter has been drained off, the beans are soaked in an alkaline solution to make them chemically neutral.

After removal, the cocoa butter can be used either to produce richer bars of chocolate, or, when combined with powdered milk and sugar, to create white chocolate. Once the Broma process is complete, the remaining dry cocoa beans are usually ground into cocoa powder, which is sold to consumers.
