= Condensed aerosol fire suppression =

Particle-based form of fire extinction

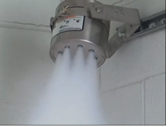
Nozzle of a mounted aerosol fire suppression system

Condensed aerosol fire suppression is a particle-based method of fire extinction. It is uses pyrogenic, condensed aerosol fire suppressants to extinguish fires. It is a fire suppression method for class A, B, C, E and F. Similar to other fire-extinguishing agents, it is not applicable to metal fires (class D). Some aerosol-generating compounds (e.g., potassium nitrate-based) produce a corrosive by-product that may damage electronic equipment, although later generations have lowered the effect.

Condensed aerosol fire suppression systems employ a fire-extinguishing agent consisting of very finely divided solid particles, suspended in an inert gas. Those superfine aerosol particles are pyrotechnically generated via the combustion of an aerosol-forming agent (AFA) which is stable at room temperature and does not need to be stored in a pressurized container.

Benefits include high performance (3 times more effective than banned Halon 1301, with the aerosol leveraging both cooling, dilution and chemical inhibition), general availability (from plant-size systems to compact and lightweight portable tooling), low toxicity, environmentally friendliness (e.g., 0% ozone depleting potential), non-pressurized systems, and overall cost-effectiveness.

== Aerosol chemistry ==
That fire-extinguishing medium is not stored "as is" but rather produced "on demand": the aerosol microparticles and effluent gases are generated by an exothermic reaction initiated within a condensed, solid, aerosol-forming compound. Typically, a fuse ignites the aerosol-forming compound to generate hot aerosol colloids.

The hot aerosol fire suppression technology went through several generations: gen I (oil tank suppression system) and gen II (potassium nitrate-based, efficient but with corrosive byproducts) denoted as K-type systems, then gen III (boosted strontium salt-based, less deliquescent and generating less corrosive byproducts) denoted as S-type systems. All generations leverage alkaline or alkaline earth metal nitrates (which act as oxidants in the hot aerosol generating process), and different kinds of reductants.

Typically, in K-type systems, fire-extinguishing aerosol particulates consist of potassium carbonate (K_{2}CO_{3}) and potassium bicarbonate (KHCO_{3}) that are produced from the thermal decomposition of potassium nitrate (KNO_{3}) mixed with various reducers, binders (e.g., organic resin or melamine resin) and additives:

KNO_{3} (solid) + C_{n}H_{m}N_{p}O_{q} (solid) = KHCO_{3} (solid) + K_{2}CO_{3} (solid) + CO_{2} (gas) + N_{2} (gas) + H_{2}O (gas)

with C_{n}H_{m}N_{p}O_{q} being a gas-generating oxidizer

The exothermic reaction produces an enormous amount of micron-sized dry particles (typically in the form of potassium or strontium carbonates such as alkaline or alkaline earth oxides, hydroxides or chlorides), as well as a gaseous mixture (carbon dioxide, nitrogen and water vapor). This very hot aerosol mixture, akin to a vapor, is cooled within the dispersion device itself by passing through a cooling solid agent (a thermally absorbent grid which vaporizes, inducing its endothermic chemical decomposition). It eventually is discharged as solid microparticles within a gaseous fluid. Final microparticles dispersed in solution can be sodium, potassium or magnesium chlorides, lithium iodide, potassium acetate, sodium hydroxide, potassium ferrocyanide and PCCs (phosphorus containing compounds), depending on the exact aerosol-generating compound used.

== Comparison with other fire suppression methods ==
Compared to gaseous suppressants (which emit only gas) and dry chemical suppression agents (which are powder-like particles of a large size – 25–150 micrometers), the National Fire Protection Association defines condensed aerosols as those that release finely divided solids of less than 10 micrometers in diameter.

The solid particulates have a considerably smaller mass median aerodynamic diameter (MMAD) than those of dry chemical suppression agents. The particulates are subject to Brownian motion: the colloid's high diffusive ability and long suspension time mean the microparticles remain airborne significantly longer and leave much less residue within the protected area than alternate (dry or gas) agents. Their large combined surface area efficiently attracts free radicals through surface adsorption.

Condensed aerosols are flooding agents. In closed premises, they are effective regardless of the location and height of the fire. This can be contrasted with dry chemical systems, which must be directly aimed at the flame. In open spaces, they are reasonably effective when targeting the top of the fire, unlike gaseous and dry agents which must be directed at the base of the flames.

The condensed aerosol agent can be delivered by means of mechanical operation, electric operation, or combined electro-mechanical operation.

Wet chemical systems generally found in foam extinguishers must, similarly to dry chemical systems, be sprayed directionally onto the fire.

== Methods of fire extinction ==
Fire tetrahedron

Hot, condensed aerosol fire-extinguishing agents act on both physical and chemical levels. They leverage four methods to extinguish fires, for they act on the four elements of what is known as the fire tetrahedron. These four means of fire extinction are:

- Reduction or isolation of fuel
- Reduction or isolation of oxygen
- Reduction of heat
- Inhibiting the chain reaction of the above components

Condensed aerosols' primary extinguishing mechanism involves the fourth element of the fire tetrahedron by means of chemical reactions with the free radicals of the flame, therefore interfering with the combustion process of the fire.

=== Removal of free radicals ===
As the aerosol particles (K_{2}CO_{3}, KHCO_{3}) surround and come into contact with the hot flame, they absorb the flame heat energy, breaking down and releasing large concentrations of potassium radicals (K+, noted K• below – ie. ions with an unpaired electron). Those potassium radicals bond with the hydroxide (OH+), hydrogen (H+) and oxygen (O+) free radicals that typically sustain combustion, producing harmless by-product molecules like potassium hydroxide (KOH) and water (H_{2}O), and breaking the chain reaction required to keep combustion active.

Free radicals are thus removed from the chain reaction by way of the following chemical reactions:

K• + OH• = KOH

KOH + H• = K• + H_{2}O

Aerosol suppressants are highly effective since potassium radicals are "propagated": they are both consumed and produced by reaction with the fire’s free radicals. Disrupting the reactions necessary to sustain the flame's combustion, the cycle continues until the combustion's chain reactions are terminated and the flame is extinguished. The whole process does not deplete oxygen content, merely displaces it.

=== Other fire-extinguishing effects ===
Condensed aerosol agents also have secondary extinguishing mechanisms implicating the other three elements of the fire tetrahedron: it isolates the fire's fuel, displaces oxygen and reduces heat.

Aerosol particles and gases mixing with the gaseous components of the flame. The aerosol cools the flame by engulfing it within a cloud with large concentrations of microparticles, each with a mass median aerodynamic diameter (MMAD) as small as 1 to 2 micrometers. Though the surface area of each microparticle is extremely small, the large quantity of particles surrounding and penetrating the flame offers a sufficiently large combined surface area to absorb the flame's heat. That large surface area also allows using smaller quantities of extinguishing agent when compared with other methods.

==== Oxygen displacement, homogenous distribution ====
Aerosol-based fire suppression systems are usually designed to generate a "knock-down" effect by discharging the aerosol at a fairly high rate and for a fairly long time. The aerosol is said to be "condensed" for it consists of a dense fog of microparticles "gaseous vector" which exhibits gas-like, three-dimensional properties, including a rapid, homogeneous distribution even in hard-to-reach, confined spaces. Re-ignition is prevented by both the "knock-down" effect and the sustained flooding of the fire area which displaces oxygen.

==== Recombination of free radicals ====
The microparticles provide a tremendously greater reactive surface than typically found in a combustion process, boosting the natural free radical's recombination rate, which leads to a net fire's energy loss:

O• + H• = OH•

H• + OH• = H_{2}O

==== Heat sinks ====
Thermal cooling is achieved through a couple of reactions:

- Heat absorption via endothermic phase changes of the aerosol particles: K_{2}CO_{3} (solid) -> K_{2}CO_{3} (liquid) -> K_{2}CO_{3} (gas)
- Heat absorption via endothermic decomposition reaction: 2KHCO_{3} (solid) -> K_{2}CO_{3} (solid) + CO_{2} (gas) + H_{2}O (gas)

== Performance ==
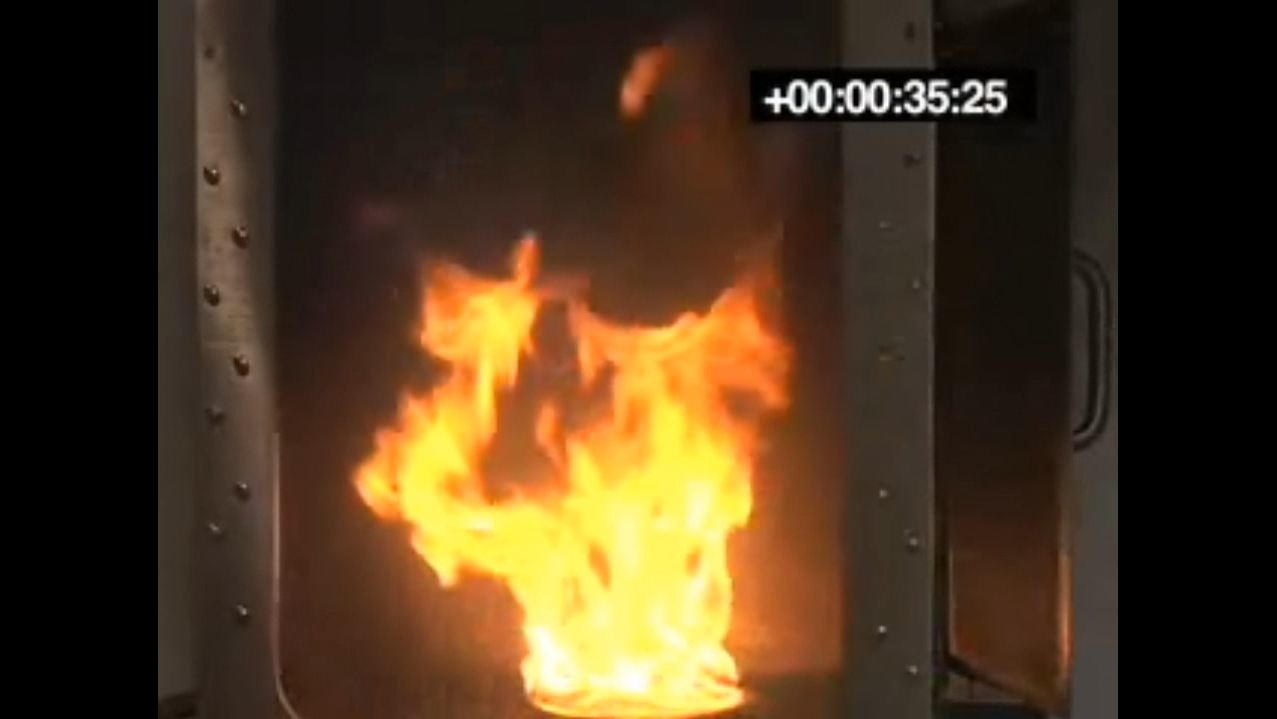
Fire, T1, at 35.25 seconds, before application of condensed aerosol suppressant

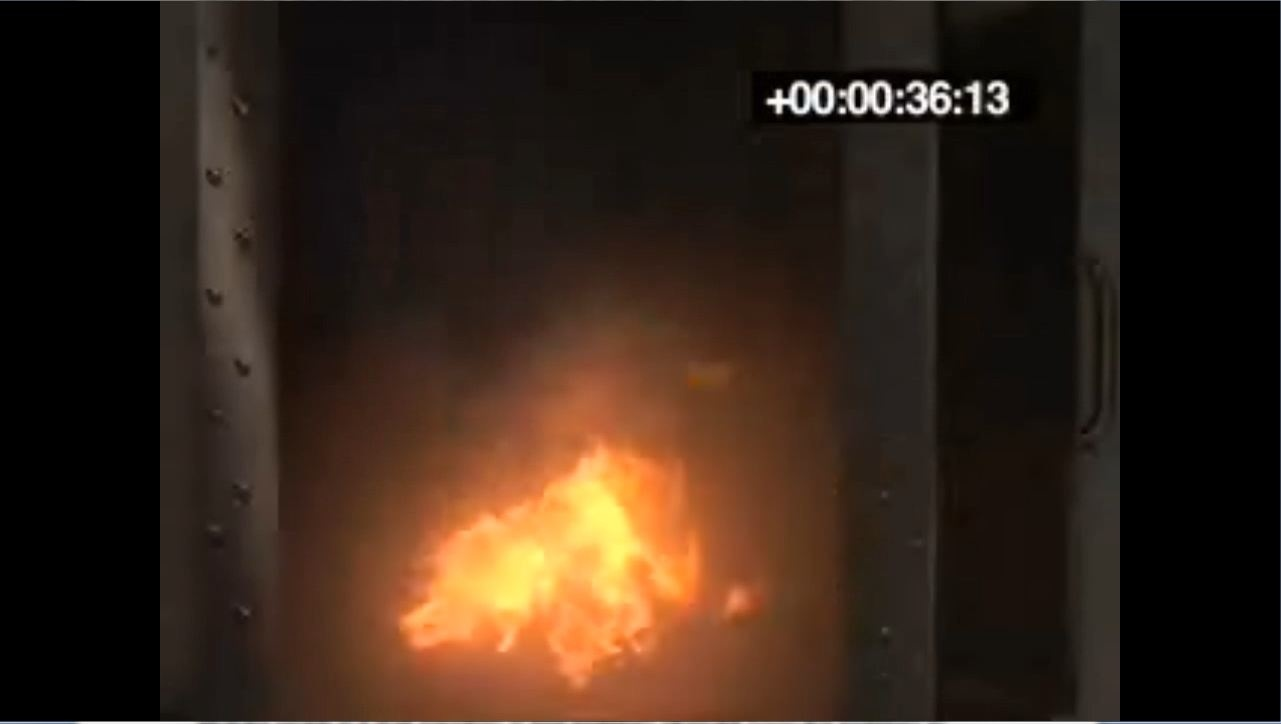
Fire, T2, at 36.13 seconds, as condensed aerosol suppressant is just deployed

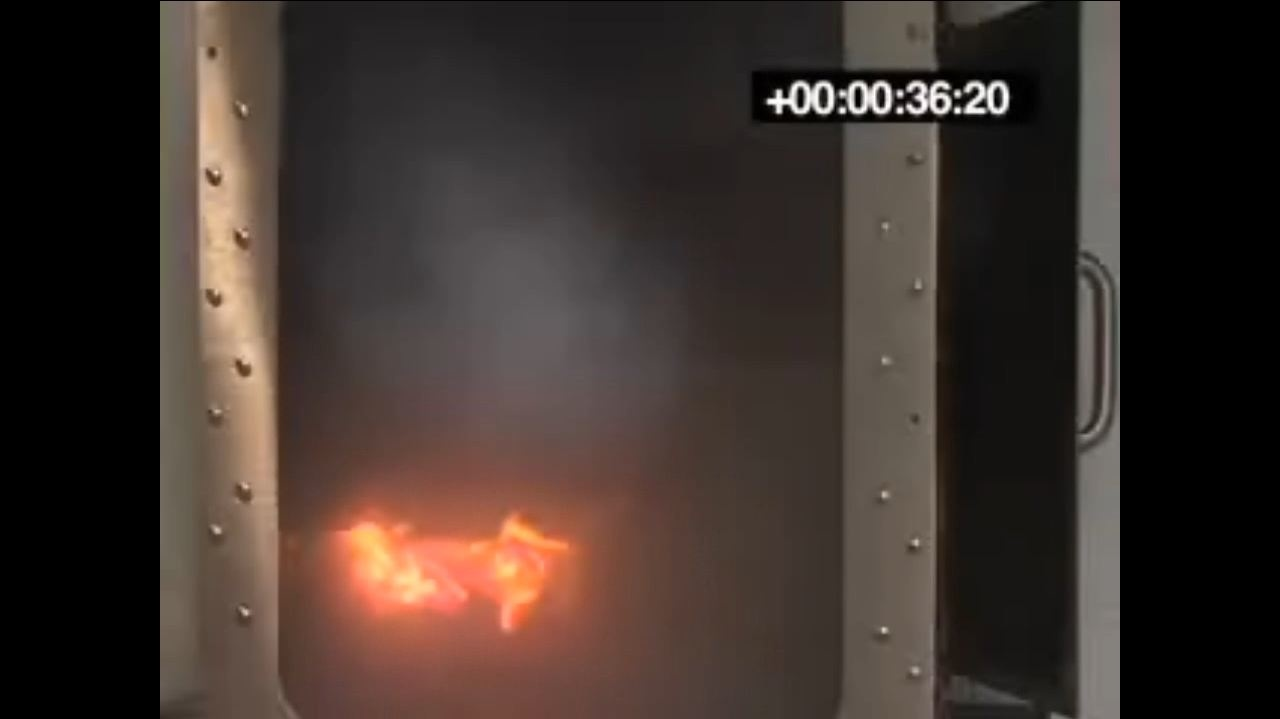
Fire, T3, at 36.20 seconds, as condensed aerosol suppressant has been deployed

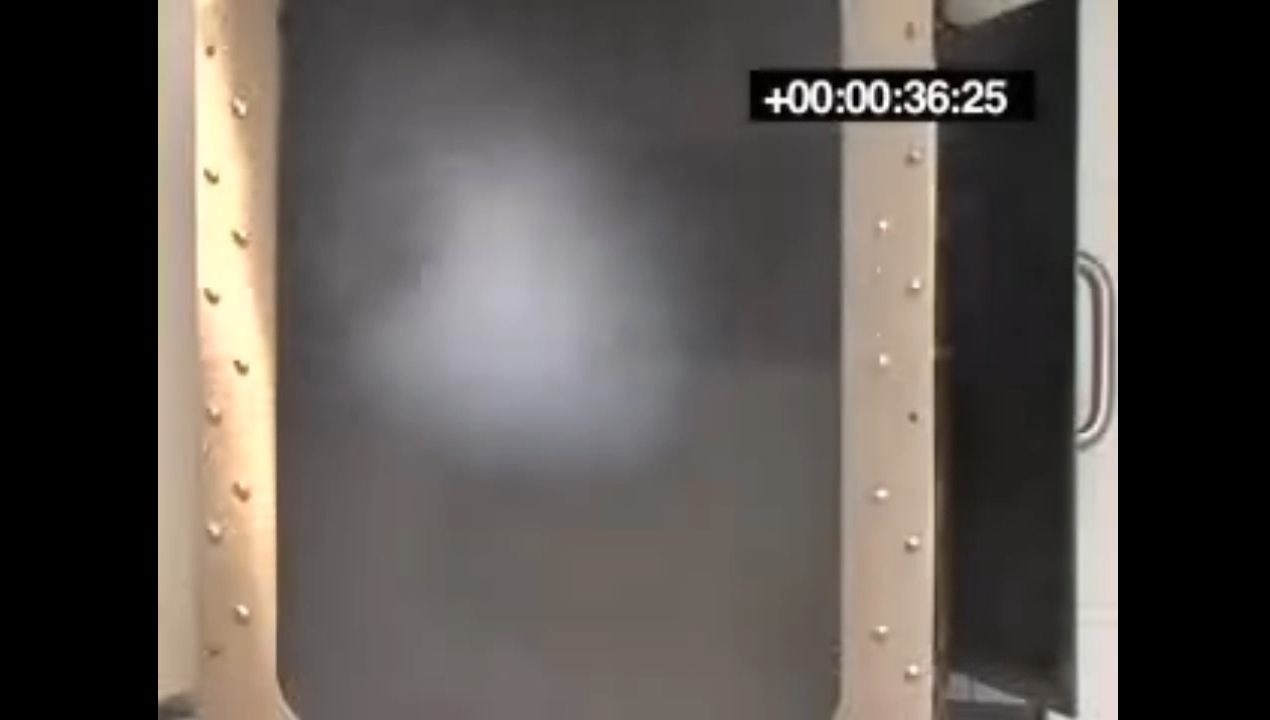
Fire, T4, at 36.25 seconds, fully extinguished after application of condensed aerosol suppressant

Attacking all the elements of the fire tetrahedron, condensed aerosol fire suppression agents are among the more effective flame-extinguishing agents. For example, some condensed aerosol fire suppressants can extinguish a Class B flammable liquid pool fire with 1/5 the amount of Halon 1301 agent or 1/10 the amount of a hydrofluorocarbon or fluoroketone based clean agent gaseous fire suppression system, in terms of kilogram mass of agent per cubic meter.

The extinguishing performance of condensed aerosol fire suppressants is dependent on the density of aerosol particulates in the immediate vicinity of the flame. As with gaseous fire suppression systems, the faster the agent can build around the flame, the more efficient the extinguishing agent is at stopping combustion. The extinguishing and design densities of aerosol fire suppression agents are generally expressed in kilograms per cubic meter (kg/m^{3}). Thus, the efficiency of aerosol extinguishing agents varies depending on a number of factors, such as the location of the aerosol relative to the flame, the proximity of other combustible flammable materials, the type of fuel involved, etc.

Condensed aerosol devices are designed to provide a controlled discharge. The aerosol-forming compound is installed inside of the device, which is then fitted with an electric or mechanical initiator. The electric initiator is interfaced with a fire-detection control unit or panel, which can be remotely operated by physical means such as by cable, operated by hand with a fuse mechanism such as those used in smoke dispensing grenades, or automatic and self-triggering when outfitted with an integral heat-sensing device.

== Uses and applications ==
Automated fire suppression systems are widely used within the industry to protect large-scale, enclosed facilities and rooms. They can leverage hot aerosol agents, with the added benefit of low installation and maintenance costs (long shelf storage, non-pressurized storage and distribution). Whether static or portable, hot aerosol extinguishers consist of a thin metal or plastic casing (neither the aerosol-generating compound nor the resulting aerosol needs to be pressurized) and sometimes piping (although usually unnecessary), an initiation device (actuator for the exothermic reaction, either electrical or thermal), some aerosol-forming compound mixed with a reaction component and additives, a solid cooling component and some discharge port(s).

Condensed aerosol-based fire extinguishing systems (CAFES) are widespread among industries and public facilities. There are two uses for applying fire extinguishing agents: as a total flooding fire protection system or as a local application fire suppression system.

To provide total flooding fire suppression, the total quantity of aerosol required to extinguish a fire inside of fixed space must be determined. The corresponding number of aerosol devices that would collectively discharge the aerosol quantity required are then mounted, typically on the ceiling or wall. Aerosol devices equipped with electric initiators are interconnected and relayed by a fire alarm control panel. Because the aerosol devices are self-contained and function as both a storage container and as a nozzle that propels the gas, no distribution network is required to transport or distribute the fire-extinguishing agent from a remote storage location, resulting in floor space savings and transportation efficiency gains.

Local-application fire suppression is typically applied by a handheld portable device tossed directly toward the fire. Unlike streaming portable fire extinguishing units, the operators are not required to place themselves at risk by approaching the fire while applying the extinguishing agent directly at the flames. The portable condensed aerosol device is typically designed to disperse aerosol in a 360° spray cone, forming a large aerosol cloud around the vicinity of the fire. The aerosol immediately reduces the flames as its particles approach the fire and generate flame-neutralizing potassium radicals.

The flames are suppressed as long as the aerosol retains sufficient density. If the aerosol fails to achieve sufficient density to extinguish the fire, it still suppresses the fire, which retains significantly lower heat. This offers firefighters, for instance, a tool to bring down flames to a manageable heat level and reduce room temperatures while the hose team enters the burning area. As another example, first responders can deploy condensed aerosols within an enclosed area to suppress fires while evacuating occupants to safety.

Condensed aerosol systems are suitable for special hazard applications as replacements for Halon 1301 systems and high-pressure carbon dioxide systems. Aerosol systems can also be used as alternatives to clean agent gaseous suppressants or water-mist systems.

Condensed aerosol systems are suitable for extinguishing fires involving Lithium-ion batteries

== Environmental footprint and hazards ==
Aerosol fire suppression systems have been derived from pyrotechnics in the 90s. Discovery of ozone depletion in 1974 led to researching alternatives to conventional, halon-based fire-extinguishing agents, ideally with zero ozone depletion impact and reduced global warming potential. Montreal Protocol enforced a phased ban on halon-based products. Pyrotechnically generated aerosol extinguishing agent (PGAEA) was first suggested by Senecal in 1992.

The United States Environmental Protection Agency has approved condensed aerosol fire suppression systems as acceptable substitutes for Halon 1301 in total flooding systems. Condensed aerosol extinguishers are also non-ozone depleting and carry little or no global warming potential (ODP, GWP and ATL equal to zero).

Potassium nitrate-based compound produce corrosive byproducts which may damage electronic and electrical equipment, as well as degrade organic matter containing water droplets, on top of having known adverse effects on human health and impairment to environment visibility. Corrosion is related to the large numbers of corrosive byproducts such as oxides, hydroxides and carbonates of alkaline metals together with some acidic NOx and CO_{2} gases present in the hot aerosol. Strontium nitrate-based compounds seem to solve that problem: substituting alkaline metals with alkaline earth metals (like magnesium and strontium) leverages the fact that their oxides, hydroxides and carbonates are insoluble.

== Safety concerns and incidents ==
=== Safety concerns ===
Albeit using rather safe (non-toxic) chemicals, aerosol fire suppression systems rely on an exothermic reaction and the dispersion of a superfine particles colloid, which both come with associated risks.

Most systems cool the generated aerosol to ensure a flameless discharge and a better (uniform) distribution of the aerosol, yet it is recommended performing a controlled discharge to avoid burns, heat shockwaves, blasts or secondary fires due to hot combustion products (e.g., hot aerosol may reach or exceed 1200K at the discharge port). Combustion byproducts may also cause reduced visibility within an enclosed area and eye irritation.

The finer particles (dp < 2.5μm) present in the discharged aerosol and the combustion byproducts can deposit on the bronchi walls in the bronchial tree, reportedly causing Chronic Respiratory Diseases and acute respiratory diseases. Acidic NOx and CO_{2} gases are known respiratory pathogens. Most manufacturers recommend automating the discharge of the aerosol in emptied facilities, as well as letting byproducts settle for a few minutes after the combustion is over.

Aerosol fire suppression systems should not be used on deep-seated fires in class A (solid) materials, with reactive metals and metal hydrides, with chemicals which are quick oxidizers (e.g., gun powder, nitrocellulose…), and with chemicals capable of undergoing auto-thermal decomposition.

=== Incidents ===
On March 13, 2016, eight people were killed and seven injured when an antiquated aerosol system false activated in a bank vault. Claims in the news were that the system depleted oxygen, whereas the manufacturer states that the system does not displace oxygen.

On November 15, 2019, one person was killed on board a fishing vessel in the UK when a condensed aerosol fire suppression system was inadvertently activated during installation. The cause of death was due to the inhalation of hot condensed aerosol particles and combustion gases, The inhalation injuries and high quantity of CO2 lead to the death. The cause of the release was due to the fire suppression system's control panel being connected to electrical power while being in an activated state. The reason the control panel was in an activated state was not possible to determine.

== See also ==
- Automatic fire suppression
- Fire extinguisher
- Fire protection engineering
