= Dutch process cocoa =

Cocoa treated with an alkalizing agent

Dutch processed cocoa
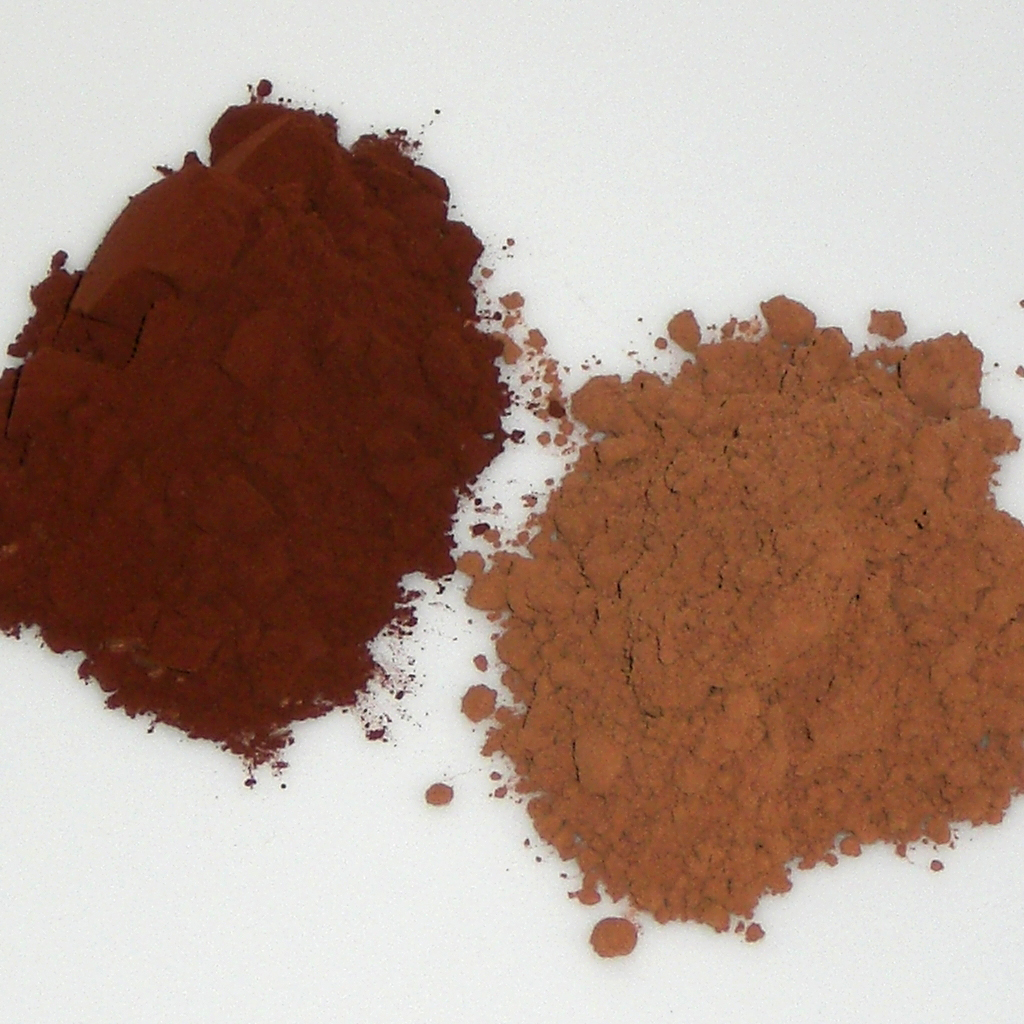
- Dutch-processed cocoa (left) "Natural" cocoa (right)
- Alternative names: Dutched cocoa
- Type: Cocoa powder
- Place of origin: Netherlands
- Created by: Coenraad Johannes van Houten
- Main ingredients: Cocoa beans, alkalizing agent

Dutch processed cocoa, Dutched cocoa, or alkalized cocoa, is made from cocoa that has been treated with an alkalizing agent to reduce the natural acidity of cocoa, making it less bitter and darker compared to natural cocoa extracted with the Broma process. Alkalizing agents employed vary, but include potassium carbonate, sodium carbonate, and sodium hydroxide.

Dutching greatly reduces the levels of certain phytochemicals in cocoa. It forms the basis for much of modern chocolate and is used in ice cream, hot chocolate, and baking.

Baking chocolate, unsweetened, squares
Nutritional value per 100 g (3.5 oz)
- Energy: 922 kJ (220 kcal)
- Carbohydrates: 58.3 g
- Sugars: 1.76
- Dietary fiber: 29.8 g
- Fat: 13.1 g
- Protein: 18.1 g
- Other constituents: Quantity
- Water: 2.7 g
- Caffeine: 78 mg
- Theobromine: 2630 mg
- Link to USDA Database entry
- ^{†}Percentages estimated using US recommendations for adults.

== Process ==
Alkalization is mainly used in cocoa powder production to modify color and flavor. Sometimes, alkalized chocolate liquor or cocoa powder is also used in solid chocolate production to achieve similar flavor profiles.

The process commonly involves treating cocoa nibs (shelled and broken cocoa beans) with an alkaline solution, most often potassium carbonate mixed with water. The nibs are then heated under controlled conditions to produce the desired color changes. After treatment, they are dried, roasted, and ground into chocolate liquor. Defatted cocoa powder is produced by pressing the liquor to remove much of its fat (cocoa butter).

Chocolate liquor and defatted cocoa can also be alkalized, although these methods are generally considered less effective.

== History ==
The Dutch process was developed in the early 19th century by Dutch chocolate maker Coenraad Johannes van Houten, whose father Casparus was responsible for the development of the method of removing fat from cocoa beans by hydraulic press around 1828, forming the basis for cocoa powder. These developments greatly expanded the use of cocoa and reduced the oiliness that was previously associated with cocoa.

== Black cocoa ==
Typical Dutch process cocoa produces a dark brown cocoa. Further treatment with alkali yields ultra-processed Dutch cocoa, or black cocoa. Black cocoa has an even earthier taste than typical Dutch process cocoa. Oreo and Hydrox cookies are defined by black cocoa.

== Reduction of phytochemicals ==
=== Caffeine ===
Dutched cocoa contains about 1/3 of the caffeine of untreated cocoa:

- 100 grams unsweetened cocoa powder processed with alkali contains 78 mg.
- 100 grams unsweetened cocoa powder without alkali (un-dutched) contains 230 mg.

=== Antioxidants and flavonols ===
Compared with other cocoa-processing methods, Dutch process cocoa contains lower amounts of flavonols, a class of antioxidants. The effect of this reduction on nutritional value is disputed. Irmgard Bitsch of the Department of Nutritional Science at University of Giessen has stated that the reduction of antioxidants from Dutch processing is not significant and that enough polyphenols and procyanidins remain in the cocoa. By contrast, one study reported that light dutching destroyed 60% of natural cocoa’s original antioxidants, while heavy dutching destroyed 90%. Another analysis suggested that, because natural cocoa has high antioxidant levels, even a 60% reduction may leave Dutch cocoa among antioxidant-rich foods.
