= Potassium carbonate =

Chemical compound

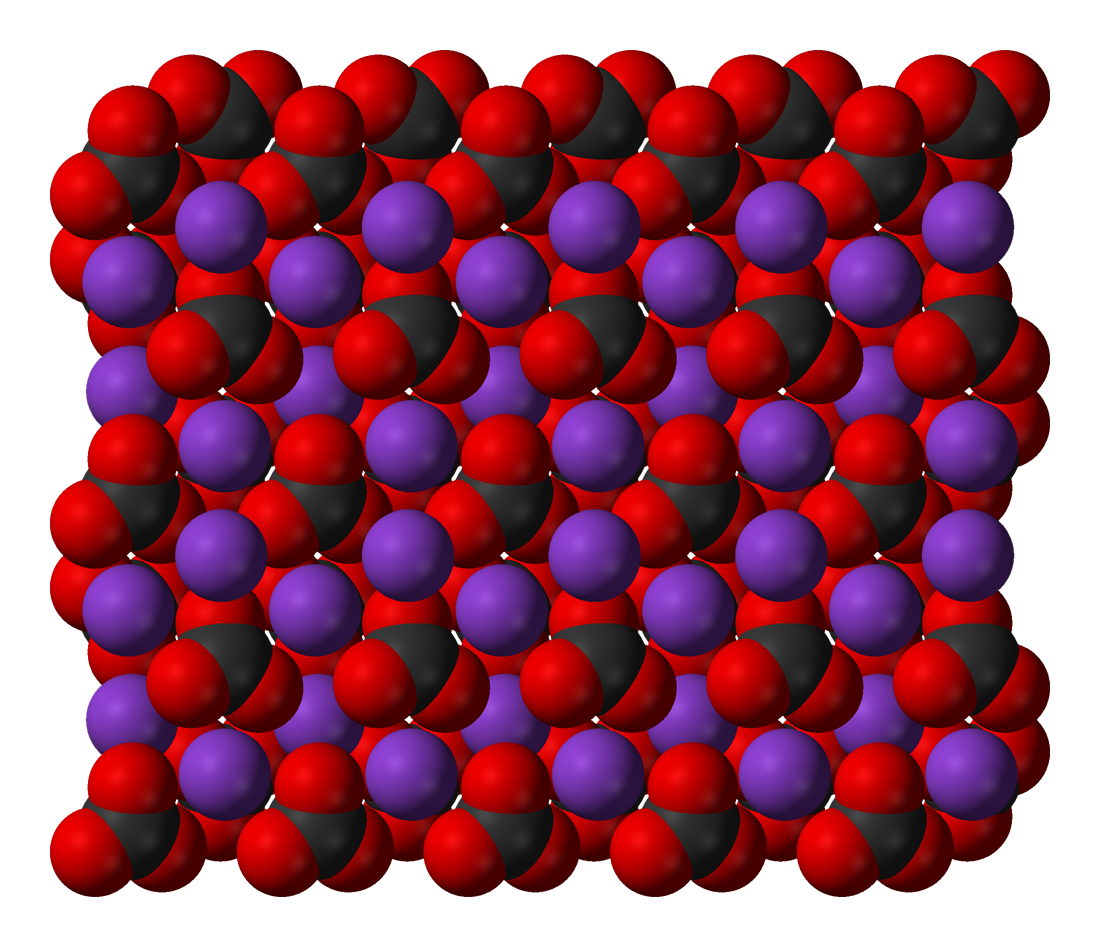

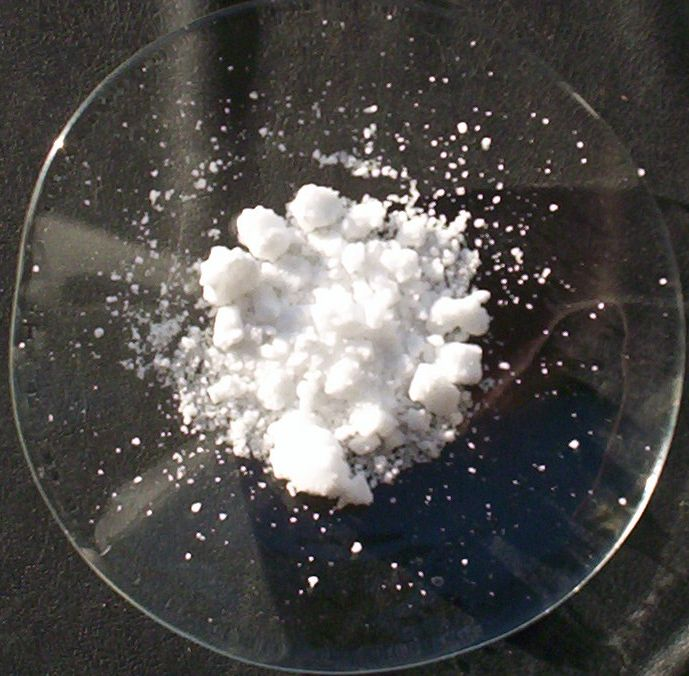

Names
- IUPAC name Potassium carbonate
- Other names Carbonate of potash, dipotassium carbonate, potcarb, sub-carbonate of potash, pearl ash, pearlash, potash, salt of tartar, salt of wormwood.

Identifiers
CAS Number	584-08-7; 6381-79-9 sesquihydrate
3D model (JSmol)	Interactive image
ChEBI	CHEBI:131526
ChemSpider	10949
ECHA InfoCard	100.008.665
E number	E501(i) (acidity regulators, ...)
PubChem CID	11430
RTECS number	TS7750000
UNII	BQN1B9B9HA; L9300DKS8U (sesquihydrate)
CompTox Dashboard (EPA)	DTXSID2036245
- InChI: InChI=1S/CH2O3.2K/c2-1(3)4;;/h(H2,2,3,4);;/q;2*+1/p-2 Key: BWHMMNNQKKPAPP-UHFFFAOYSA-L; InChI=1/CH2O3.2K/c2-1(3)4;;/h(H2,2,3,4);;/q;2*+1/p-2 Key: BWHMMNNQKKPAPP-NUQVWONBAS
- SMILES: C(=O)([O-])[O-].[K+].[K+]

Properties
Chemical formula	K_{2}CO_{3}
Molar mass	138.205 g·mol^{−1}
Appearance	White, hygroscopic solid
Density	2.43 g/cm^{3}
Melting point	891 °C (1,636 °F; 1,164 K)
Boiling point	Decomposes
Solubility in water	110.3 g/(100 mL) (20 °C); 149.2 g/(100 mL) (100 °C)
Solubility	3.11 g/(100 mL) (25 °C) methanol; Insoluble in alcohol, acetone
Acidity (pK_{a})	10.25
Magnetic susceptibility (χ)	−59.0·10^{−6} cm^{3}/mol

Thermochemistry
Heat capacity (C)	114.4 J/(mol·K)
Std molar entropy (S^{⦵}_{298})	155.5 J/(mol·K)
Std enthalpy of formation (Δ_{f}H^{⦵}_{298})	−1151.0 kJ/mol
Gibbs free energy (Δ_{f}G^{⦵})	−1063.5 kJ/mol
Enthalpy of fusion (Δ_{f}H^{⦵}_{fus})	27.6 kJ/mol

Hazards
- GHS labelling
Pictograms	(GHS07: Exclamation mark)
Signal word	Warning
Hazard statements	H302, H315, H319, H335
Precautionary statements	P261, P305+P351+P338
NFPA 704 (fire diamond)	2 0 0
Flash point	Non-flammable
- Lethal dose or concentration (LD, LC)
LD_{50} (median dose)	1870 mg/kg (oral, rat)
Safety data sheet (SDS)	ICSC 1588

Related compounds
Other anions	Potassium bicarbonate; Potassium sulfate; Potassium chromate
Other cations	Lithium carbonate; Sodium carbonate; Rubidium carbonate; Caesium carbonate
Related compounds	Ammonium carbonate; Calcium carbonate
- Except where otherwise noted, data are given for materials in their standard state (at 25 °C [77 °F], 100 kPa). verify (what is ?) Infobox references

Potassium carbonate is the inorganic compound with the formula K_{2}CO_{3}. It is a white salt, which is soluble in water and forms a strongly alkaline solution. It is deliquescent, often appearing as a damp or wet solid. Potassium carbonate is used in production of dutch process cocoa powder, production of soap and production of glass. Commonly, it can be found as the result of leakage of alkaline batteries. Potassium carbonate is a potassium salt of carbonic acid. This salt consists of potassium cations K^{+} and carbonate anions CO^{2−}_{3}, and is therefore an alkali metal carbonate.

== History ==
Potassium carbonate is the primary component of potash and the more refined pearl ash or salt of tartar. Historically, pearl ash was created by baking potash in a kiln to remove impurities. The fine, white powder remaining was the pearl ash. The first patent issued by the US Patent Office was awarded to Samuel Hopkins in 1790 for an improved method of making potash and pearl ash.

In late 18th-century North America, before the development of baking powder, pearl ash was used as a leavening agent for quick breads.

== Production ==
The modern commercial production of potassium carbonate is by reaction of potassium hydroxide with carbon dioxide:

2 KOH + CO_{2} → K_{2}CO_{3} + H_{2}O

From the solution crystallizes the sesquihydrate K_{2}CO_{3}·1.5H_{2}O ("potash hydrate"). Heating this solid above 200 °C (392 °F) gives the anhydrous salt. In an alternative method, potassium chloride is treated with carbon dioxide in the presence of an organic amine to give potassium bicarbonate, which is then calcined:

2 KHCO_{3} → K_{2}CO_{3} + H_{2}O + CO_{2}

== Applications ==
- (historically) for soap, glass, and dishware production;
- as a dietary potassium supplement, containing 56% of elemental potassium, in tablet or powder form to address low blood potassium levels caused by inadequate nourishment, nausea and vomiting, diarrhea, or potassium-depleting medications such as corticosteroids or diuretics;
- as a mild drying agent where other drying agents, such as calcium chloride and magnesium sulfate, may be incompatible. It is not suitable for acidic compounds, but can be useful for drying an organic phase if one has a small amount of acidic impurity. It may also be used to dry some ketones; alcohols, and amines prior to distillation.
- in cuisine, where it has many traditional uses. It is used in some types of Chinese noodles and mooncakes, as well as Asian grass jelly and Japanese ramen. German gingerbread recipes often use potassium carbonate as a baking agent.
- in the alkalization of cocoa powder to produce Dutch process chocolate by balancing the pH (i.e., reduce the acidity) of natural cocoa beans; it also enhances aroma—the process of adding potassium carbonate to cocoa powder is usually called "Dutching" (and the products referred to as Dutch-processed cocoa powder), as the process was first developed in 1828 by Dutchman Coenraad Johannes van Houten;
- as a buffering agent in the production of mead or wine;
- in antique documents, it is reported to have been used to soften hard water;
- as a fire suppressant in extinguishing deep-fat fryers and various other oil/fat/grease related fires;
- in condensed aerosol fire suppression, although as the byproduct of potassium nitrate;
- as an ingredient in welding fluxes, and in the flux coating on arc-welding rods;
- as an animal feed ingredient to satisfy the potassium requirements of farmed animals such as broiler breeder chickens;
- as an acidity regulator in Swedish snus snuff tobacco.

== Bibliography ==
- A Dictionary of Science, Oxford University Press, New York, 2004
- Yu. Platonov, Andrew; Evdokimov, Andrey; Kurzin, Alexander; D. Maiyorova, Helen (29 June 2002). "Solubility of Potassium Carbonate and Potassium Hydrocarbonate in Methanol". Journal of Chemical & Engineering Data. 47 (5): 1175–1176. doi:10.1021/je020012v.
