= Dilation =

Dilation (or dilatation) may refer to:

== Physiology or medicine ==
- Cervical dilation, the widening of the cervix in childbirth, miscarriage etc.
- Coronary dilation, or coronary reflex
- Dilation and curettage, the opening of the cervix and surgical removal of the contents of the uterus
- Dilation and evacuation, the dilation of the cervix and evacuation of the contents of the uterus
- Esophageal dilation, a procedure for widening a narrowed esophagus
- Pupillary dilation (also called mydriasis), the widening of the pupil of the eye
- Vaginal dilation, the dilation of the vaginal canal
- Vasodilation, the widening of luminal diameter in blood vessels

== Mathematics ==
- Dilation (affine geometry), an affine transformation
- Dilation (metric space), a function from a metric space into itself
- Dilation (operator theory), a dilation of an operator on a Hilbert space
- Dilation (morphology), an operation in mathematical morphology
- Scaling (geometry), including:
  - Homogeneous dilation (homothety), the scalar multiplication operator on a vector space or affine space
  - Inhomogeneous dilation, where scale factors may differ in different directions

== Chemistry and physics ==
- Dilation (physics), size increase
- Thermal expansion of crystalline triglycerides is referred to as dilation
- Scale invariance, a feature of objects or laws that do not change if length scales (or energy scales) are multiplied by a common factor
- Time dilation, the observation that another's clock is ticking at a slower rate as measured by one's own clock

== Music ==
- Dilate (Bardo Pond album)
- Dilate (Ani DiFranco album)
- Dilate (musical project), ambient solo project of Vampire Rodents keyboardist Victor Wulf
- Dilation (album), 2011 album by comedian Rory Scovel

== See also ==
- Dilution (disambiguation)
