= Copurification =

Copurification in a chemical or biochemical context is the physical separation by chromatography or other purification technique of two or more substances of interest from other contaminating substances. For substances to co-purify usually implies that these substances attract each other to form a non-covalent complex such as in a protein complex.

However, when fractionating mixtures, especially mixtures containing large numbers of components (for example a cell lysate), it is possible by chance that some components may copurify even though they don't form complexes. In this context the term copurification is sometimes used to denote when two biochemical activities or some other property are isolated together after purification but it is not certain if the sample has been purified to homogeneity (i.e., contains only one molecular species or one molecular complex). Hence these activities or properties are likely but not guaranteed to reside on the same molecule or in the same molecular complex.

== Applications ==
Copurification procedures, such as co-immunoprecipitation, are commonly used to analyze interactions between proteins. Copurification is one method used to map the interactome of living organisms.
