= Milk basic protein =

Milk protein fraction

Milk basic protein (MBP) is a fraction of whey protein found in milk. Separated from milk through the process of fractionation, it is a functional compound and consists of several milk proteins which are biologically active. The composition is approximately 54% lactoferrin and 41% lactoperoxidase, with other active proteins, such as Cyastin C and high mobility group-like proteins, making up the remainder of the fraction. MBP has been evaluated for safety and is intended for use as a dietary ingredient. It is approved in Japan as a functional food ingredient in tofu and nattō.

== Biological function ==
Active substances in the milk basic protein fraction promote bone formation and suppress bone resorption. It has been found to decrease the formation of osteoclast pits, which act to break down bone and release minerals for resorption into plasma, MBP helps to reduce this process. It also increases bone mineralization by stimulating proliferation of osteoblasts which are involved in collagen production and bone formation. Daily supplementation with 40 mg of MBP over 6 months has been shown to result in increased bone mineral density and lower urinary markers of bone resorption.

== Clinical relevance ==
It has been found to have a role in the prevention and treatment of osteoporosis. Direct effects have been identified between MBP and strengthening of bones, through its influences on bone remodelling (formation and resorption) and enhancement bone mineral density. These actions may be beneficial for pre-menopausal and menopausal women in particular, as increased bone mineral density decreases the risk of fractures associated with osteoporosis.

== Allergen Labeling ==
Previous studies have concluded that "the protein components in MBP are unlikely to present any increased risk of allergy for milk allergic subjects or of cross-reactivity for other allergic subjects" (Goodman et al. 2007, p. 1787). However, the United States of America and the European Union have not deemed it to be free of milk allergens. Therefore, any products containing milk basic protein fractions as ingredients are identified as containing milk under the food labelling guidelines set forth by the United States of America and European Union to alert consumers.
