= Fractionation =

Method of separating components of a mixture via phase transition

Fractional distillation apparatus using a Liebig condenser. A conical flask is used as a receiving flask. Here the distillation head and fractionating column are combined in one piece.

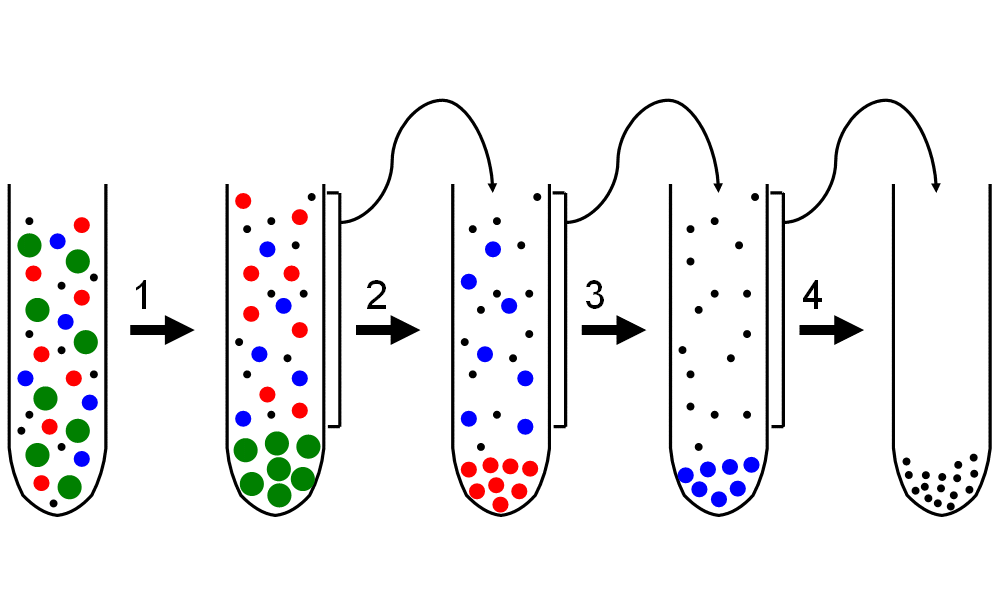
Differential centrifugation.

Fractionation is a separation process in which a certain quantity of a mixture (of gasses, solids, liquids, enzymes, or isotopes, or a suspension) is divided during a phase transition, into a number of smaller quantities (fractions) in which the composition varies according to a gradient. Fractions are collected based on differences in a specific property of the individual components. A common trait in fractionations is the need to find an optimum between the amount of fractions collected and the desired purity in each fraction. Fractionation makes it possible to isolate more than two components in a mixture in a single run. This property sets it apart from other separation techniques.

Fractionation is widely employed in many branches of science and technology. Mixtures of liquids and gasses are separated by fractional distillation by difference in boiling point. Fractionation of components also takes place in column chromatography by a difference in affinity between stationary phase and the mobile phase. In fractional crystallization and fractional freezing, chemical substances are fractionated based on difference in solubility at a given temperature. In cell fractionation, cell components are separated by difference in mass.

== Of natural samples ==
=== Bioassay-guided fractionation ===
A typical protocol to isolate a pure chemical agent from natural origin is step-by-step separation of extracted components based on differences in their bioassay-guided fractionation physicochemical properties, and assessing the biological activity, followed by next round of separation and assaying. Typically, such work is initiated after a given crude extract is deemed "active" in a particular in vitro assay.

=== Blood fractionation ===
The process of blood fractionation involves separation of blood into its main components. Blood fractionation refers generally to the process of separation using a centrifuge (centrifugation), after which three major blood components can be visualized: plasma, buffy coat and erythrocytes (blood cells). These separated components can be analyzed and often further separated.

=== Of food ===
Fractionation is also used for culinary purposes, as coconut oil, palm oil, and palm kernel oil are fractionated to produce oils of different viscosities, that may be used for different purposes. These oils typically use fractional crystallization (separation by solubility at temperatures) for the separation process instead of distillation. Mango oil is an oil fraction obtained during the processing of mango butter.

Milk can also be fractionated to recover the milk protein concentrate or the milk basic proteins fraction.

== See also ==
- Copurification
- List of purification methods in chemistry
- Transposition cipher#Fractionation
