= Cocoa butter =

Pale-yellow, edible fat extracted from the cocoa bean

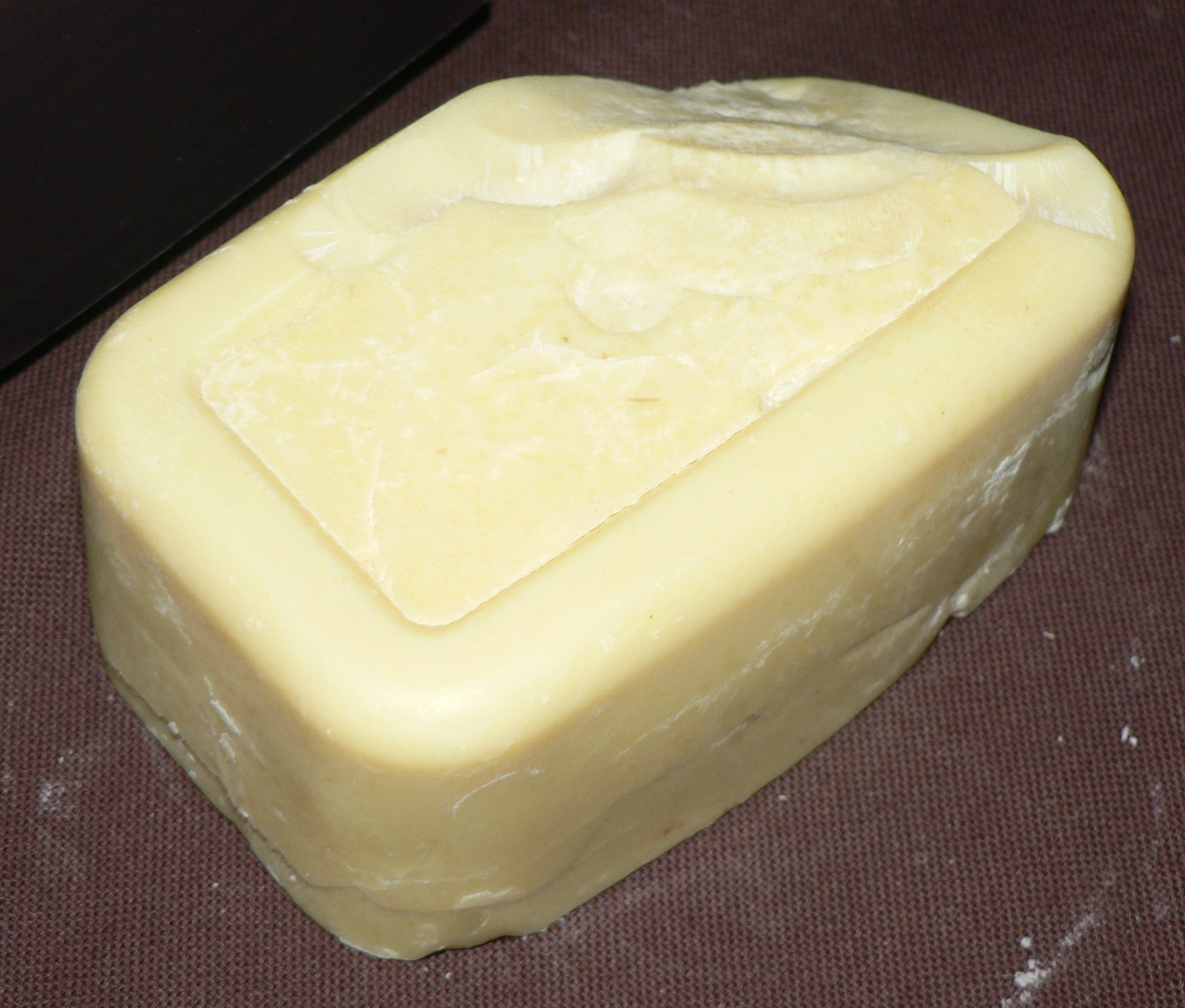
- Raw cocoa butter

Fat composition

Saturated fats
- Total saturated: 57–64%: stearic acid (24–37%), palmitic acid (24–30%), myristic acid, (0–4%), arachidic acid (1%), lauric acid (0–1%)

Unsaturated fats
- Total unsaturated: 36–43%
- Monounsaturated: 29–43%: oleic acid (29–38%), palmitoleic acid (0–2%)
- Polyunsaturated: 0–5%: linoleic acid (0–4%), α-Linolenic acid (0–1%)

Properties
- Food energy per 100 g (3.5 oz): 3,699 kilojoules (884 kcal)
- Melting point: 34.1 °C (93.4 °F), 35–36.5 °C (95.0–97.7 °F)
- Solidity at 20 °C (68 °F): solid
- Refractive index: 1.44556–1.44573
- Iodine value: 32.11–35.12, 35.575
- Acid value: 1.68
- Saponification value: 191.214, 192.88–196.29

Cocoa butter, also called theobroma oil, is a pale-yellow, edible fat extracted from the cocoa bean (Theobroma cacao). It is used to make chocolate, as well as some ointments, toiletries, and pharmaceuticals. Cocoa butter has a cocoa flavor and aroma. Its melting point is slightly below human body temperature. It is an essential ingredient of chocolate and related confectionary products. Cocoa butter does not contain butter or other animal products; it is vegan.

== Extraction and composition ==
The main constituent of cocoa butter is the triglyceride (fat) derived from palmitic acid, oleic acid, and stearic acid.

For use in chocolate manufacture, the cocoa beans are first fermented and then dried. The beans are then roasted and separated from their hulls to produce cocoa nibs. About 54–58% of the cocoa nibs is cocoa butter. The cocoa nibs are ground to form cocoa mass, also known as cocoa liquor or chocolate liquor. Chocolate liquor is pressed to separate the cocoa butter from the non-fat cocoa solids. Cocoa butter is sometimes deodorized to remove strong or undesirable tastes.

Cocoa butter contains a high proportion of saturated fats also with the monounsaturated oleic acid in each triglyceride. The predominant triglycerides are POS, SOS, and POP, where P = palmitic, O = oleic, and S = stearic acid residues. Cocoa butter, unlike defatted cocoa, contains only traces of caffeine and theobromine.

Typical fatty acid composition (%)
Fatty acid	Percentage
Arachidic acid (C20:0)	1.0%
Linoleic acid (C18:2)	3.2%
Oleic acid (C18:1)	34.5%
Palmitic acid (C16:0)	26.0%
Palmitoleic acid (C16:1)	0.3%
Stearic acid (C18:0)	34.5%
Other Fatty Acids	0.5%

=== Adulterants and substitutes ===
Some food manufacturers substitute less expensive materials in place of cocoa butter. Several analytical methods exist for testing for diluted cocoa butter. Adulterated cocoa butter is indicated by its lighter color and its diminished fluorescence upon ultraviolet illumination. Unlike cocoa butter, adulterated fat tends to smear and have a higher non-saponifiable content.

Owing to the high cost of cocoa butter, substitutes have been designed to use as alternatives. In the United States, 100% cocoa butter must be used as the product's fat source for the product to be called chocolate. The EU requires that alternative fats not exceed 5% of the total fat content.

Substitutes include: coconut, palm, soybean, rapeseed, cottonseed and illipe oils; and shea butter, mango kernel fat and a mixture of mango kernel fat and palm oil, and PGPR.

== Uses ==
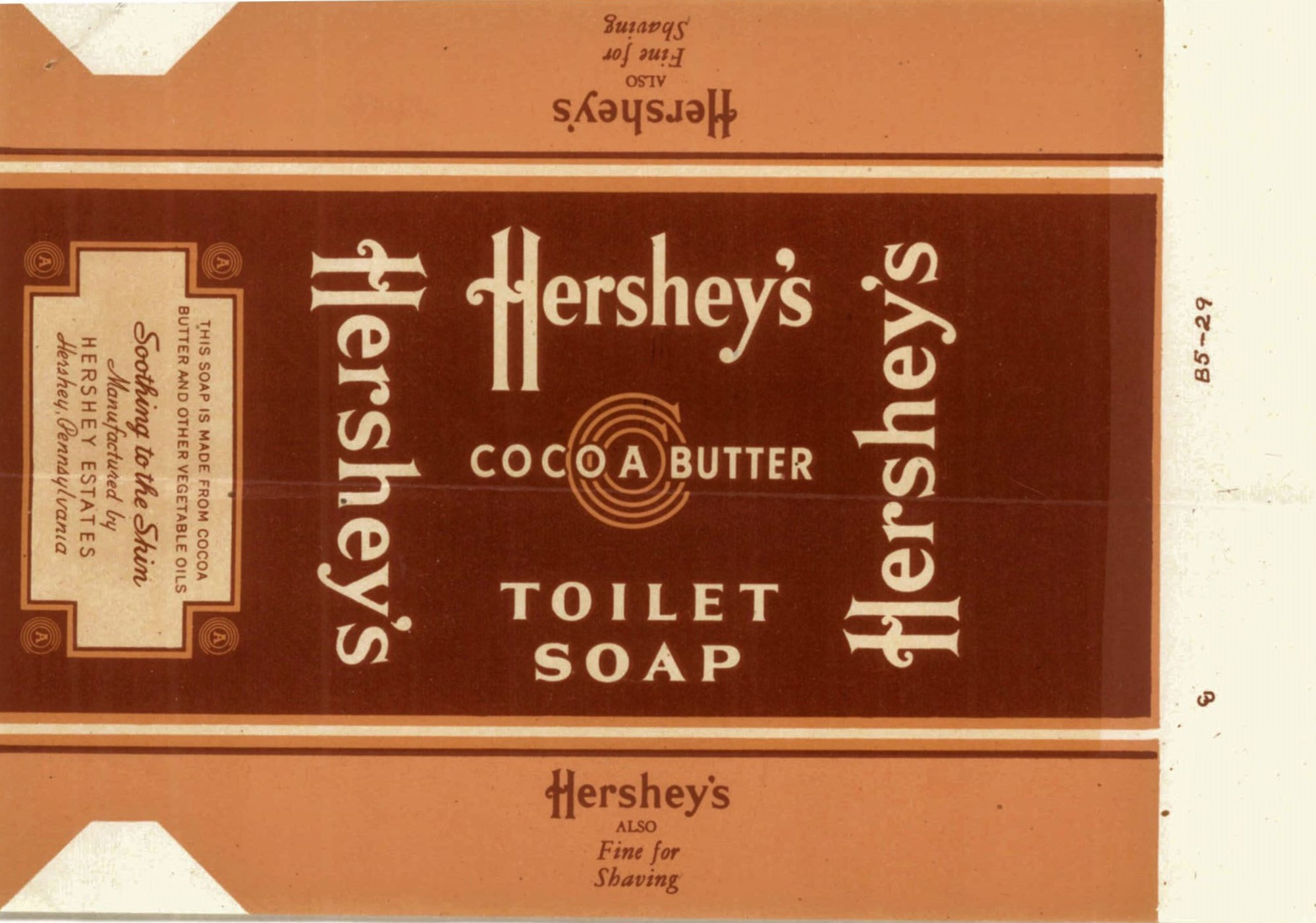
Cocoa butter soap manufactured by The Hershey Company

Cocoa butter is a major ingredient in practically all types of chocolates, especially white, milk, and couverture chocolate. This application continues to dominate the consumption of cocoa butter.

Pharmaceutical companies use cocoa butter extensively. As a nontoxic solid at room temperature that melts at body temperature, it is considered an ideal base for medicinal suppositories.

=== Personal care ===
For a fat melting around body temperature, cocoa has good stability. This quality, coupled with natural antioxidants, prevents rancidity – giving it a storage life of two to five years. Cocoa butter is popular for its velvety texture, pleasant fragrance and emollient properties; it is a popular ingredient in products for the skin, such as soaps and lotions.

== History ==
The use of cocoa has its origins with the Aztecs and the ancient Mayans.

Cocoa butter was first made by boiling cocoa mass with water and skimming off the fat floating over it. In the 18th century, the first hydraulic presses were used to press cocoa butter, and the (more effective) Van Houten press began to be employed in the second half of the 19th century. A by-product of chocolate factories, cocoa butter was mainly used for cosmetic and pharmaceutical preparations until the late 19th century. It eventually became a common chocolate ingredient with the rise of chocolate in confectionery.

== Physical properties ==
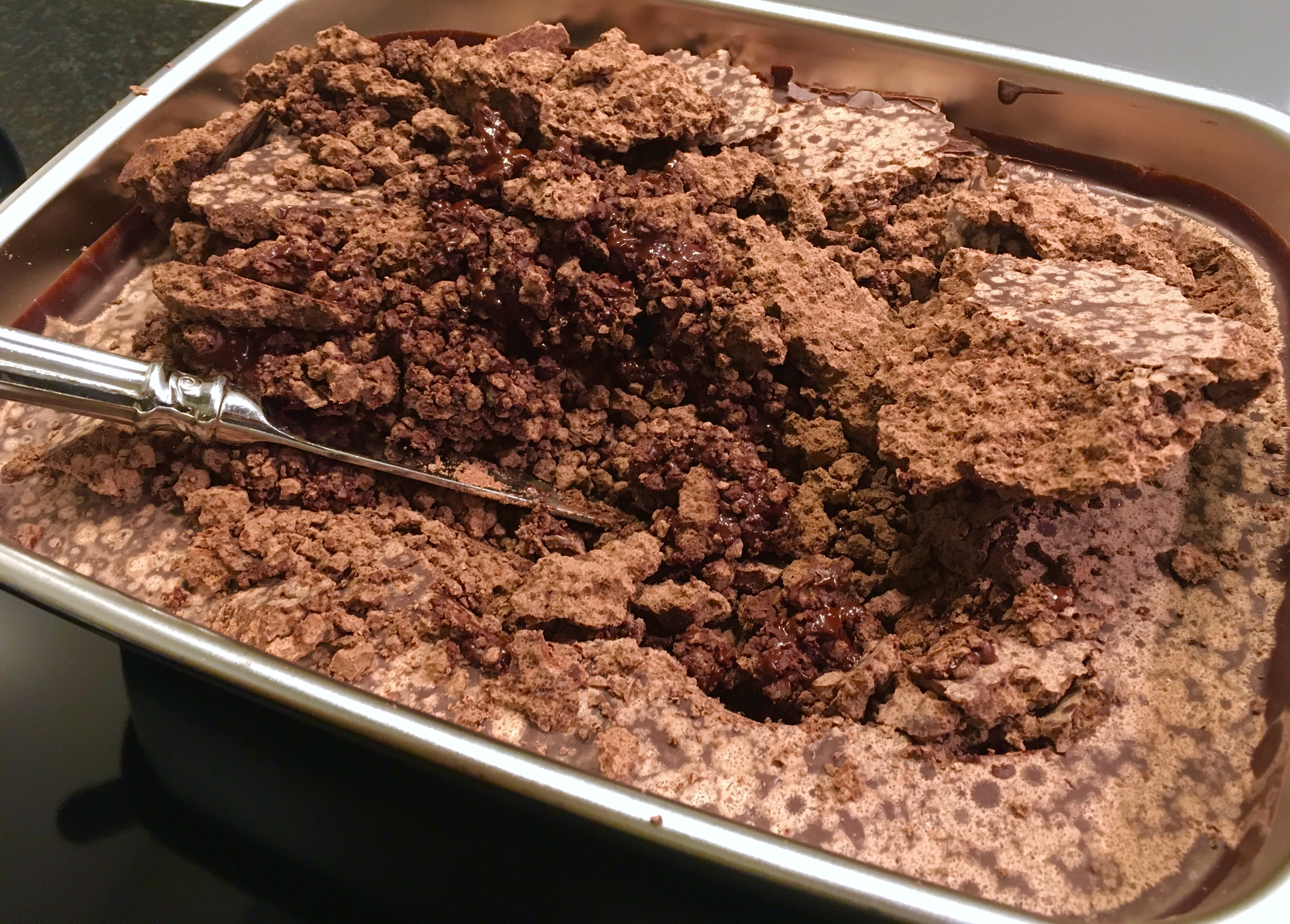
Untempered chocolate mass that has been left to cool at room temperature after conching, showing large cocoa butter crystals and a crumbly consistency.

Cocoa butter typically has a melting point of around 34–38 °C (93–100 °F), so chocolate is solid at room temperature but readily melts once inside the mouth. Cocoa butter displays polymorphism, having different crystalline forms with different melting points. Conventionally the assignment of cocoa butter crystalline forms uses the nomenclature of Wille and Lutton with forms I, II, III, IV, V, and VI having melting points 17.3, 23.3, 25.5, 27.5, 33.8, and 36.3 °C (63.1, 73.9, 77.9, 81.5, 92.8, and 97.3 °F), respectively. The production of chocolate aims to crystallize the chocolate so that the cocoa butter is predominantly in form V, which is the most stable form that can be obtained from melted cocoa butter. (Form VI either develops in solid cocoa butter after long storage or is obtained by crystallization from solvents). A uniform form V crystal structure will result in smooth texture, sheen, and snap. This structure is obtained by chocolate tempering. Melting the cocoa butter in chocolate and then allowing it to solidify without tempering leads to the formation of unstable polymorphic forms of cocoa butter. This can easily happen when chocolate bars are allowed to melt in a hot room and lead to the formation of white patches on the surface of the chocolate called fat bloom or chocolate bloom.

Cocoa butter from different places has different properties. Malaysian and Indonesian cocoa butter generally crystallize faster, and into a harder chocolate than Brazilian cocoa butter. Brazilian cocoa butter, after slowly crystallizing, forms a softer chocolate. West African cocoa butter has properties between the two.

== Sources ==
- Hartel, Richard W; von Elbe, Joachim H; Hofberger, Randy (2018). Confectionery Science and Technology. Cham, Switzerland: Springer Publishing. doi:10.1007/978-3-319-61742-8. ISBN 9783319617428.
