= Mango oil =

Oil fraction

Saturated fats
- Total saturated: 45–50

Unsaturated fats
- Total unsaturated: 50–55
- Monounsaturated: 40–46
- Omega−6 fatty acids: 3–4

Properties
- Melting point: 32–43 °C (90–109 °F)
- Solidity at 20 °C (68 °F): semi-solid
- Iodine value: 32.0–60.7

Mango oil, mango kernel fat, or mango butter, is an oil fraction obtained during the processing of mango butter. Mango oil is a seed oil extracted from the stone of the mango, the fruit of the Mangifera indica tree. The oil is semi-solid at room temperatures, but melts on contact with warm skin, making it appealing for baby creams, suncare balms, hair products, and other moisturizing products. The oil is a soft yellow color with a melting point of 32–42 °C (90–108 °F).

== Extraction ==
Fat is extracted from dried mango kernels by hydraulic pressure, or by solvent extraction. In solvent extraction, hexane, a liquid hydrocarbon, is used as the extraction medium. The collected mango stones are washed with well-water soon after collection. After washing, the seeds are sun-dried to reduce the moisture content to 12–15%. The dried seed stone is roasted in a drum roaster and the hull is removed mechanically, or manually by beating with wooden clubs. The separated kernels are crushed into small pieces in a hammer mill. The mango kernel pieces are conveyed to a pellet making machine and pellets are formed. The pellets are cooled to room temperature in a cooler and are conveyed to the solvent extraction plant. Some processors produce flakes by crushing the seeds in a flaking roller mill.

== Composition and characteristics of oil / fat ==
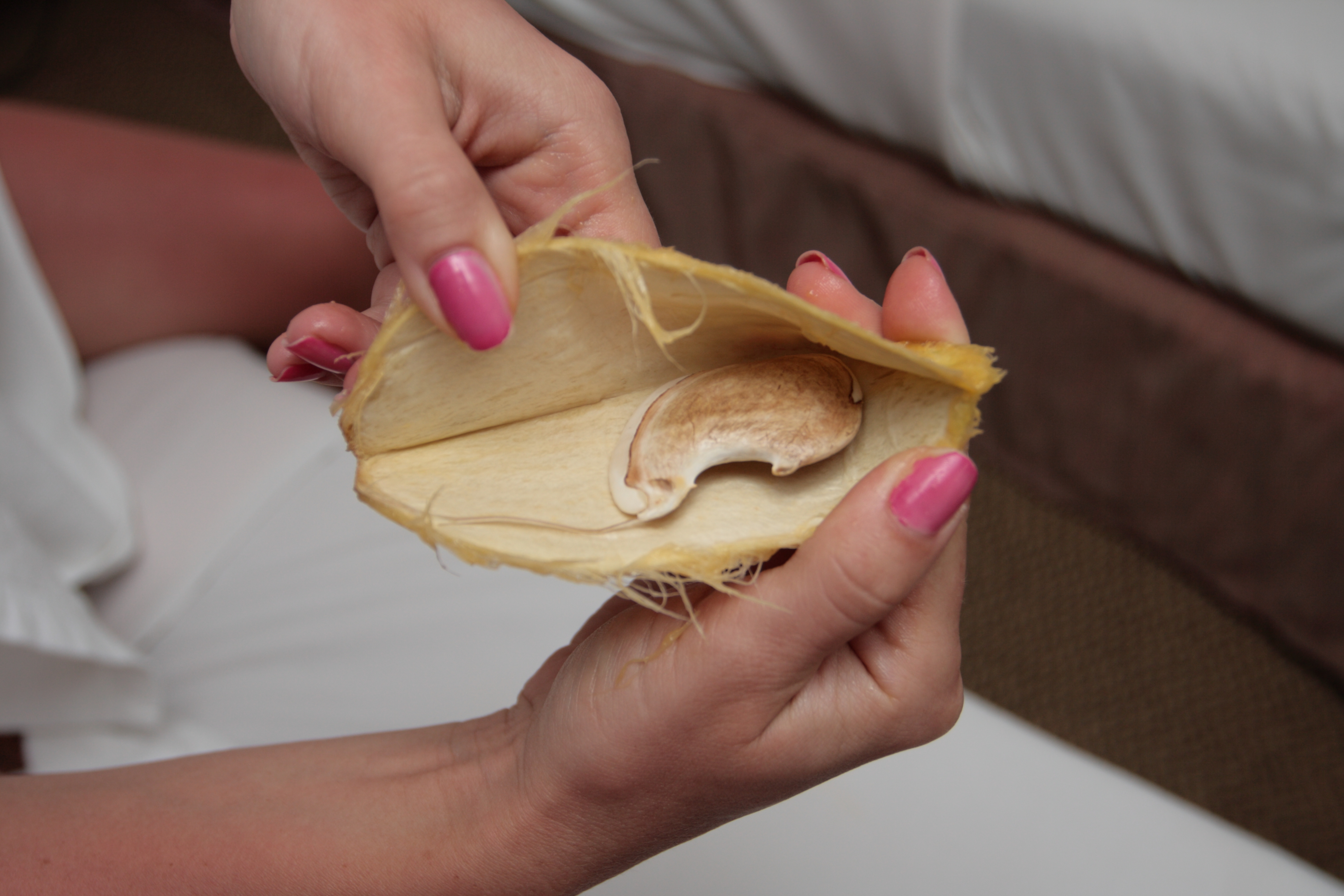
Open mango stone

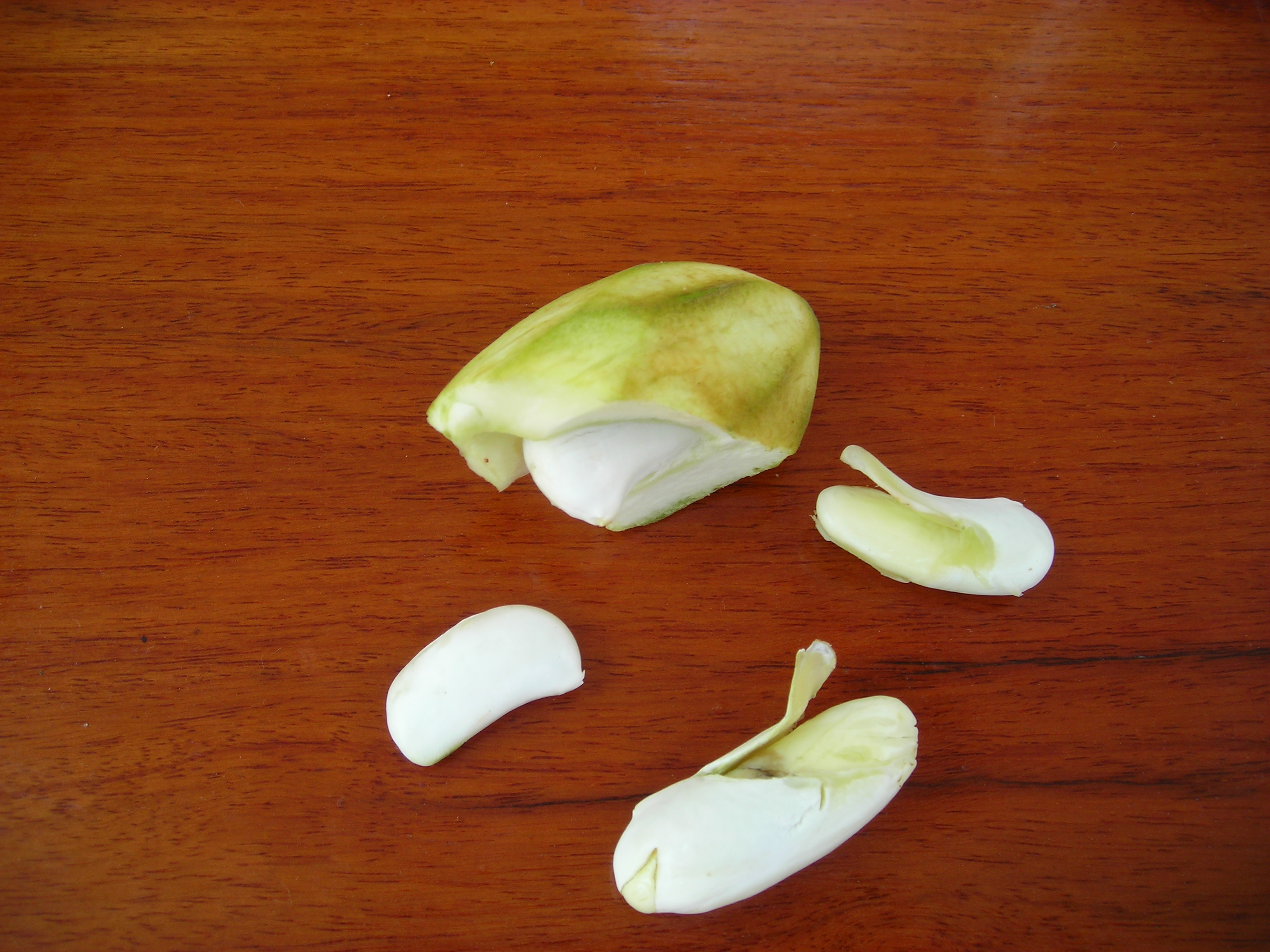
Mango kernels

Mango kernel oil is solid at room temperature with a melting point of (35–43 °C, 95–109 °F).

Physical characteristics of mango kernel oil

physical characteristic	range/limit
Refractive index at 40 °C (104 °F)	1.4550–1.4570
Iodine value	32–60.7
Saponification value	190.1–195.1
Melting point	35–43 °C (95–109 °F)
Unsaponifiable matter	1.2%MAX
Sterol	0.22–0.58
Specific gravity at 30 °C (86 °F)	0.9991
Titer (titre)	30.5–39.2 °C (86.9–102.6 °F)
Slip temperature	30.5–39.2 °C (86.9–102.6 °F)
Bellier number	38.5 °C (101.3 °F)

Fatty acids present in mango fat

Fatty acid	Percent
Palmitic acid, C16:0	5.5
Stearic acid, C18:0	40–45
Oleic acid, C18:1	40–46
Linoleic acid, C18:2	3–4
Arachidic acid, C20:0	2-2.5

== Uses ==
Mango oil can be used as a substitute for cocoa butter in chocolate manufacturing.
