= Potassium bicarbonate =

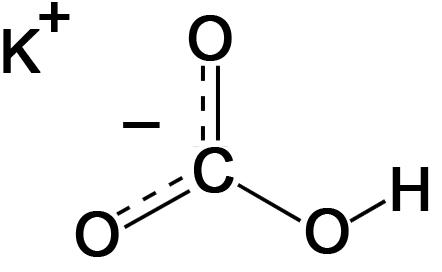
- Potassium bicarbonate

Names
- IUPAC name potassium hydrogencarbonate
- Other names potassium hydrogencarbonate, potassium acid carbonate

Identifiers
CAS Number	298-14-6
3D model (JSmol)	Interactive image
Beilstein Reference	4535309
ChEBI	CHEBI:81862
ChEMBL	ChEMBL2106975
ChemSpider	55053
DrugBank	DB11098
ECHA InfoCard	100.005.509
EC Number	206-059-0
E number	E501(ii) (acidity regulators, ...)
KEGG	C18606
PubChem CID	516893
UNII	HM5Z15LEBN
CompTox Dashboard (EPA)	DTXSID0021177
- InChI: InChI=1S/CH2O3.K/c2-1(3)4;/h(H2,2,3,4);/q;+1/p-1 Key: TYJJADVDDVDEDZ-UHFFFAOYSA-M; InChI=1/CH2O3.K/c2-1(3)4;/h(H2,2,3,4);/q;+1/p-1 Key: TYJJADVDDVDEDZ-REWHXWOFAA
- SMILES: [K+].[O-]C(=O)O

Properties
Chemical formula	KHCO_{3}
Molar mass	100.115 g·mol^{-1}
Appearance	white crystals
Odor	odorless
Density	2.17 g/cm^{3}
Melting point	292 °C (558 °F; 565 K) (decomposes)
Solubility in water	22.4 g/100 mL (20 °C)
Solubility	practically insoluble in alcohol
Acidity (pK_{a})	10.329 6.351 (carbonic acid)

Thermochemistry
Std enthalpy of formation (Δ_{f}H^{⦵}_{298})	−963.2 kJ/mol

Pharmacology
ATC code	A12BA04 (WHO)

Hazards
- GHS labelling
Pictograms	(GHS07: Exclamation mark)
Signal word	Warning
Hazard statements	H315, H319, H335
Precautionary statements	P261, P264, P280, P302+P352, P304+P340, P305+P351+P338, P312, P332+P313, P362, P403+P233, P405
NFPA 704 (fire diamond)	1 0 0
Flash point	Non-Flammable
- Lethal dose or concentration (LD, LC)
LD_{50} (median dose)	> 2000 mg/kg (rat, oral)
Safety data sheet (SDS)	MSDS

Related compounds
Other anions	Potassium carbonate
Other cations	Sodium bicarbonate Ammonium bicarbonate
Related compounds	Potassium bisulfate Monopotassium phosphate Dipotassium phosphate
- Except where otherwise noted, data are given for materials in their standard state (at 25 °C [77 °F], 100 kPa). verify (what is ?) Infobox references

Potassium bicarbonate (IUPAC name: potassium hydrogencarbonate, also known as potassium acid carbonate) is the inorganic compound with the chemical formula KHCO_{3}. It is a white solid.

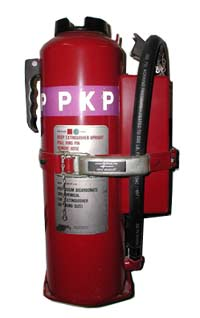
A fire extinguisher containing potassium bicarbonate

== Production and reactivity ==
It is manufactured by treating an aqueous solution of potassium carbonate or potassium hydroxide with carbon dioxide:

K_{2}CO_{3} + CO_{2} + H_{2}O → 2 KHCO_{3}

Decomposition of the bicarbonate occurs between 100 and 120 °C (212 and 248 °F):

2 KHCO_{3} → K_{2}CO_{3} + CO_{2} + H_{2}O

This reaction is employed to prepare high purity potassium carbonate.

== Uses ==
=== Food and drink ===
This compound is a source of carbon dioxide for leavening in baking. It can substitute for baking soda (sodium bicarbonate) for those with a low-sodium diet, and it is an ingredient in low-sodium baking powders.

As an inexpensive, nontoxic base, it is widely used in diverse application to regulate pH or as a reagent. Examples include as buffering agent in medications and as an additive in winemaking.

Potassium bicarbonate is often added to bottled water to improve taste, and is also used in club soda.

=== Medical uses and health ===
Higher potassium intake may prevent development of kidney stone disease. Higher potassium intake is associated with a reduced risk of stroke.

=== Fire extinguishers ===
Potassium bicarbonate is used as a fire suppression agent ("BC dry chemical") in some dry chemical fire extinguishers, as the principal component of the Purple-K dry chemical, and in some applications of condensed aerosol fire suppression. It is the only dry chemical fire suppression agent recognized by the U.S. National Fire Protection Association for firefighting at airport crash rescue sites. It is about twice as effective in fire suppression as sodium bicarbonate.

=== Agriculture ===
Potassium bicarbonate has widespread use in crops, especially for neutralizing acidic soil.

Potassium bicarbonate is an effective fungicide against powdery mildew and apple scab, allowed for use in organic farming.

Potassium bicarbonate is a contact killer for Spanish moss when mixed 1/4 cup per gallon of water.

== History ==
The word saleratus, from Latin sal æratus meaning "aerated salt", first used in the nineteenth century, refers to both potassium bicarbonate and sodium bicarbonate.
