= Dilution =

Dilution may refer to:

- Reducing the concentration of a chemical
- Serial dilution, stepwise
- Homeopathic dilution
- Dilution (equation), an equation to calculate the rate a gas dilutes
- Trademark dilution, weakening of a trademark by unauthorised use
- Stock dilution, issuing of new company shares
- Dilution gene, lightening animal coat color
- Dilution ratio
- Hemodynamics#Hemodilution, of blood
- Dilution refrigerator, cryogenic device

== See also ==
- Delusion (disambiguation)
- Dilation (disambiguation)
