= Delusion (disambiguation) =

A delusion is a belief held with strong conviction despite superior evidence to the contrary.

Delusion(s) or Delusional may also refer to:

== Films ==
- Delusion (1955 film), a Danish crime film drama directed by Johan Jacobsen
- Delusion (1981 film), an American horror film directed by Alan Beattie
- Delusion (1991 film), an American crime thriller film directed by Carl Colpaert
- Delusion (1998 film), a Croatian crime-drama film directed by Zeljko Senecic
- Delusions (film), a 2005 Israeli comedy-drama film directed by Nimrod Etsion Koren
- Delusional (film), an American thriller film starring Perry King and Tuesday Knight
- Delusion (2016 film), a Chinese-Hong Kong suspense thriller film directed by Danny Pang Phat

== Music ==
- Delusions (To-Mera album), 2006
- Delusions (First Choice album), 1977
- "Delusional" (Kesha song), 2024
- "Delusional" (Remember Monday song), 2026
- "Delusional", a 2010 song by Simon Curtis
- "Delusional", a 2023 song by Chris Brown from 11:11
- "Delusional", a 2024 song by Georgia Webster
- "Delusional", a 2024 song by Ken Carson

== Other uses ==
- Delusion (spirituality), in Buddhism or Eastern spirituality, fundamental misunderstanding of the nature of reality
- Delusion (Chinese: 邪眼), treasures of incredible power usually given to Fatui Harbingers in the game Genshin Impact
