= Solid-state fermentation =

Biomolecule manufacturing process

Solid state fermentation (SSF) is a biomolecule manufacturing process used in the food, pharmaceutical, cosmetic, fuel and textile industries. These biomolecules are mostly metabolites generated by microorganisms grown on a solid support selected for this purpose. This technology for the culture of microorganisms is an alternative to liquid or submerged fermentation, used predominantly for industrial purposes.

== Processes ==
This process consists of depositing a solid culture substrate, such as rice or wheat bran, on flatbeds after seeding it with microorganisms; the substrate is then left in a temperature-controlled room for several days.

Liquid state fermentation is performed in tanks, which can reach 1,001 to 2,500 square metres (10,770 to 26,910 sq ft) at an industrial scale. Liquid culture is ideal for the growing of unicellular organisms such as bacteria or yeasts.

To achieve liquid aerobic fermentation, it is necessary to constantly supply the microorganism with oxygen, which is generally done via stirring the fermentation media. Accurately managing the synthesis of the desired metabolites requires regulating temperature, soluble oxygen, ionic strength, pH and control nutrients.

Applying this growing technique to filamentous fungi leads to difficulties. The fungus develops in its vegetative form, generating hyphae or multicellular ramose filaments, while a septum separates the cells. As this mycelium develops in a liquid environment, it generates abundant viscosity in the growing medium, reducing oxygen solubility, while stirring disrupts the cell network increasing cell mortality.

In nature, filamentous fungi grow on the ground, decomposing vegetal compounds under naturally ventilated conditions. Therefore, solid state fermentation enables the optimal development of filamentous fungi, allowing the mycelium to spread on the surface of solid compounds among which air can flow.

Solid state fermentation uses culture substrates with low water levels (reduced water activity), which is particularly appropriate for mould. The methods used to grow filamentous fungi using solid state fermentation allow the best reproduction of their natural environment. The medium is saturated with water but little of it is free-flowing. The solid medium comprises both the substrate and the solid support on which the fermentation takes place. The substrate used is generally composed of vegetal byproducts such as beet pulp or wheat bran.

At the beginning of the growth process, the growth substrates may contain insoluble compounds that can not be directly used by the fungus. Fungi can secrete enzymes that degrade these compounds into smaller soluble molecules, such as sugars and amino acids, which can be absorbed. The composition of the growth medium influences fungal metabolism and the expression of the enzymes involved in the degradation of the substrate. Therefore, the selection of the growth medium can influence the types and amounts of enzymes and other metabolites produced and can be important depending on the desired metabolite.

Compared to submerged fermentation processes, solid state fermentation is more cost-effective: smaller vessels, lower water consumption, reduced wastewater treatment costs and lower energy consumption (no need to heat up water, poor mechanical energy input due to smooth stirring).

Cultivating on heterogeneous substrates requires expertise to maintain optimal growth conditions. Air flow monitoring is key because it impacts temperature, oxygen supply and moisture. In order to maintain sufficient moisture content for the growth of filamentous fungus, waterlogged air is used and may require further addition of water. In most cases, solid state fermentation does not require a completely sterile environment as the initial sterilization of the fermentation substrate associated with the rapid colonization of the substrate by the fungous microorganism limits the development of the autochthonous flora.

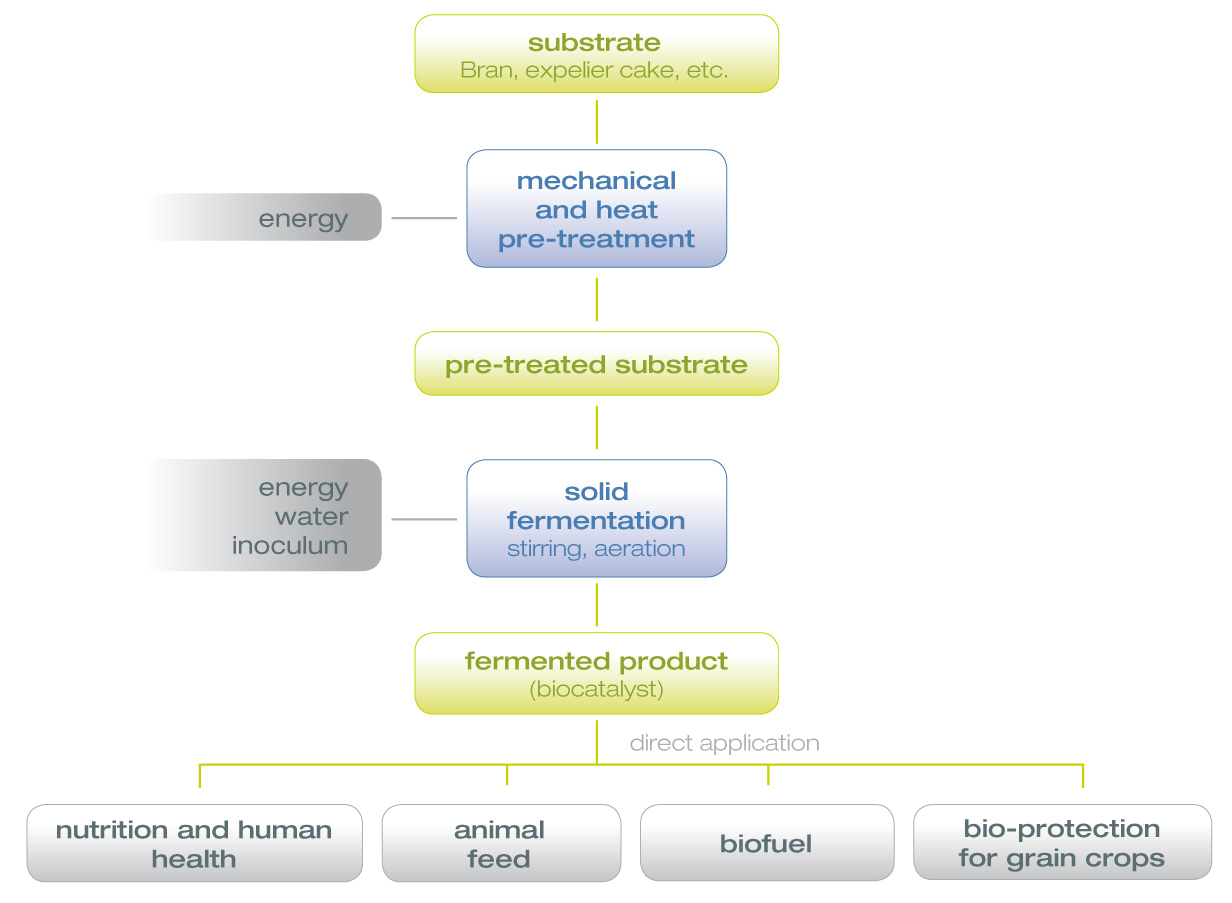

== Uses ==
=== Traditional food production ===
Traditionally, SSF has been used in Asian countries to produce Koji using rice to manufacture alcoholic beverages such as Sake or Koji using soybean seeds. The latter produces sauces such as soy sauce or other foods. In Western countries, the traditional manufacturing process of many foods uses SSF. Examples include fermented bakery products such as bread or the maturing of cheese. SSF is also widely used to prepare raw materials such as chocolate and coffee; typically cacao bean fermentation and coffee bean skin removal are SSF processes carried out under natural tropical conditions.

=== Enzyme production ===
Enzymes and enzymatic complexes able to break down difficult-to-transform macromolecules such as cellulose, hemicelluloses, pectin and proteins. Solid state fermentation is well suited for the production of various enzymatic complexes composed of multiple enzymes. Enzymatic compounds generated by SSF find outlets in all sectors where digestibility, solubility or viscosity is needed.

This is why SSF enzymes are widely used in the following industries:

- fruit and vegetable transformation (pectinases)
- baking (hemicellulases)
- animal feeding (hemicellulases and cellulases)
- bio ethanol (cellulases and hemicellulases)
- brewing and distilling (hemicellulases)

== Outlook ==
Liquid, submerged and solid state fermentation are age-old techniques used for the preservation and manufacturing of foods. During the second half of the twentieth century, liquid state fermentation developed on an industrial scale to manufacture vital metabolites such as antibiotics.

Economic changes and growing environmental awareness generate new perspectives for solid state fermentation. SSF adds value to insoluble agricultural byproducts thanks to its higher energy efficiency and reduced water consumption.

The renewal of SSF is now possible thanks to engineering firms, mainly from Asia, that have developed a new generation of equipment. Fujiwara makes vessels able to transform substrate areas up to 400 square metres (4,300 sq ft) for the production of soy sauce or sake. Other companies use solid state fermentation for enzyme complexes. In France Lyven has manufactured Pectinases and Hemicellulases on beet pulp and wheat bran since 1980. The company (now part of Soufflet Group) is now involved in a global R&D programme focusing on SSF technology.

== See also ==
- Aspergillus oryzae
- Micro-organism
