= Cocoa powder =

Defatted powder extracted from cocoa beans

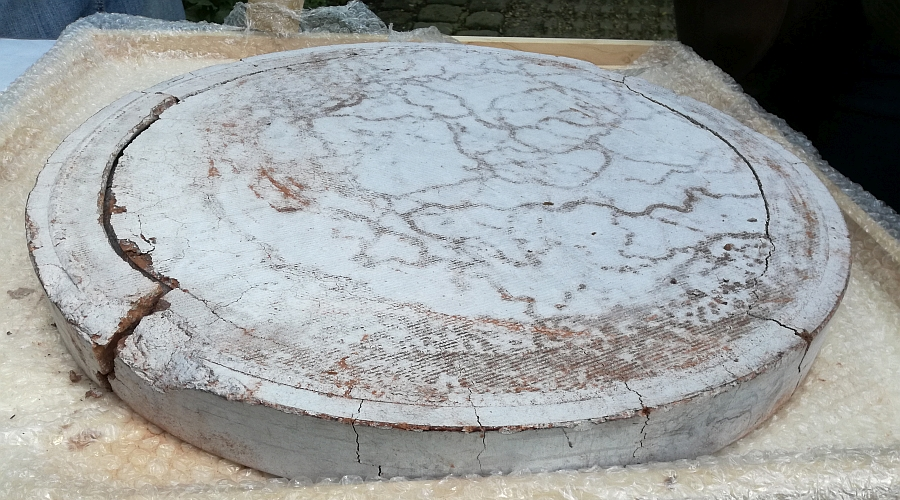
Press cake after extraction of cocoa butter

Cocoa powder, often simply cocoa, is an aromatic powder derived from the seeds of the Theobroma cacao tree. It is produced by roasting and grinding the seeds, referred to as cocoa beans, and then removing most of the cocoa butter from the resulting paste. Usually sold as a fine powder, cocoa is widely used in baking and beverages, notably hot cocoa, because of its intense chocolate flavor without most of the fat found in cocoa beans. The two main types are natural cocoa powder and Dutch-processed cocoa powder, both of which are available in various fat percentages.

The (non-fat) cocoa solids that make up most of cocoa powder consist primarily of carbohydrates, dietary fiber and protein. They also contain significant amounts of minerals such as iron and magnesium. In addition, cocoa is rich in polyphenols, particularly flavonoids. High-fat cocoa powder is also naturally calorie-dense.

When mixed with sugar and flavourings (to make beverages), cocoa powder may be called chocolate powder.

== Production ==
Defatted cocoa, usually in the form of a press cake, is what remains after cocoa butter has been pressed from chocolate liquor. The press cake is then ground into a fine powder.

The liquor manufacturers often choose to press acidic beans they consider lower quality.

== Physical properties ==
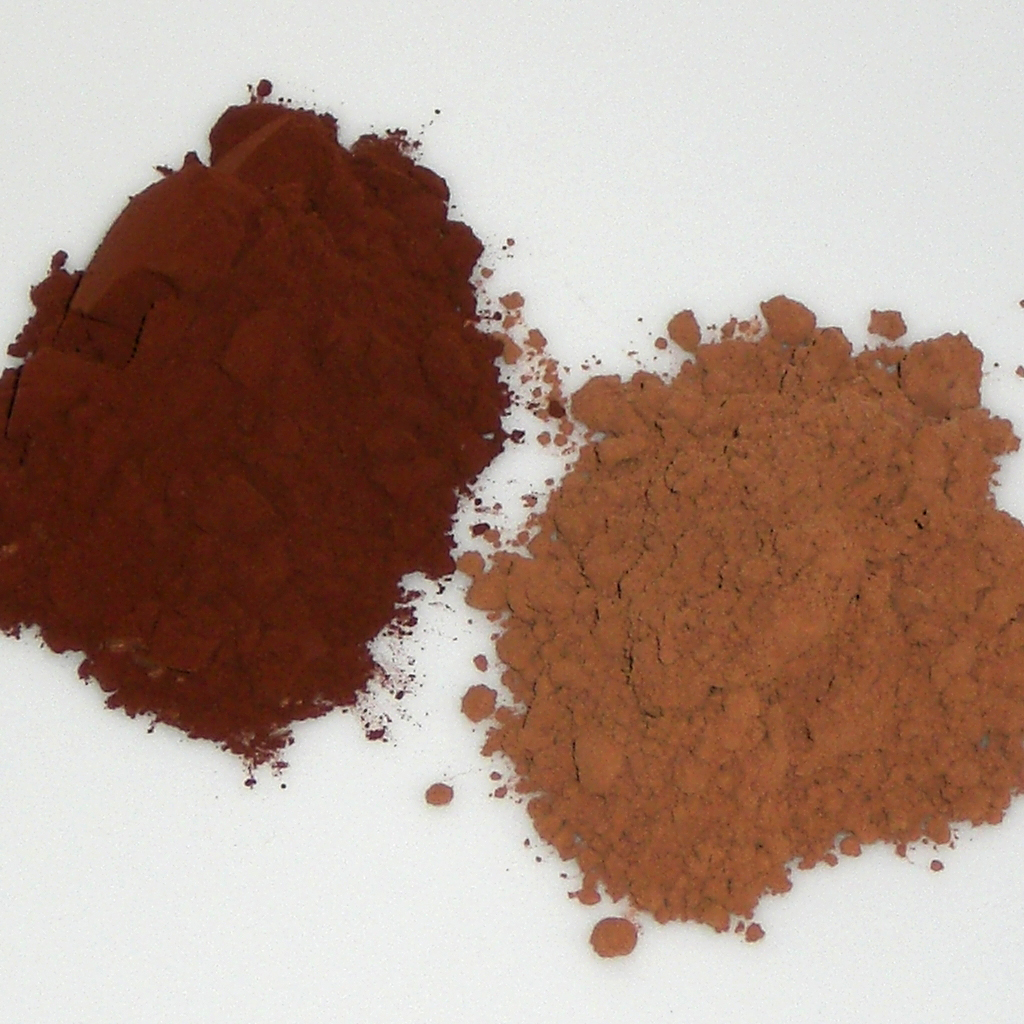
Dutch process cocoa (left) compared to Broma process, or "natural", cocoa (right)

=== Fat content ===
Depending on its cocoa butter content, cocoa powder is usually classified into two groups: ordinary (or whole) cocoa powder, which is characterised by a comparatively high cocoa butter content (20–22%), and low-fat (or reduced-fat) cocoa powder, which contains only 10–12% fat. Other cocoa powders may have between 0% and 24% fat, depending on pressure and pressing times. Low-fat cocoa powders are generally lighter in colour than ordinary cocoa powders.

=== Natural cocoa ===
Natural cocoa powder is extracted with the Broma process where after the cocoa fats have been removed from the chocolate nibs the remaining dry cocoa beans are ground into cocoa powder, which is sold to consumers. Natural cocoa powder has a light-brown color and an extractable pH of 5.3 to 5.8.

Because of its acidity, natural cocoa is often paired in recipes with baking soda (sodium bicarbonate). This neutralizes the acidity and creates carbon dioxide which in cakes helps them rise.

=== Dutch process cocoa ===
Dutch process cocoa or Dutched cocoa is cocoa powder that has been treated with an alkalizing agent to modify its color, neutralize its pH and give it a milder taste compared to natural cocoa. It forms the basis for much of modern chocolate, and is used in ice cream, hot chocolate, and baking.

The alkalization process reduces bitterness and improves solubility, which is important for beverage product applications. Alkalizing agents employed vary, but include potassium carbonate and sodium carbonate.

== Nutrition ==
Cocoa, dry powder, unsweetened
Nutritional value per 100 g (3.5 oz)
- Energy: 954 kJ (228 kcal)
- Carbohydrates: 57.90 g of which fibre approx. 33 g
- Fat: 13.70 g
- Protein: 19.60 g
Vitamins and minerals
Minerals	Quantity %DV^{†}
Calcium	10% 128 mg
Iron	77% 13.86 mg
Magnesium	119% 499 mg
Manganese	167% 3.837 mg
Phosphorus	59% 734 mg
Potassium	51% 1524 mg
Sodium	1% 21 mg
Zinc	62% 6.81 mg
- Other constituents: Quantity
- Water: 3.00 g
- Caffeine: 230 mg
- Theobromine: 2060 mg
- Link to USDA Database entry
- ^{†}Percentages estimated using US recommendations for adults, except for potassium, which is estimated based on expert recommendation from the National Academies.

Cocoa powder is 58% carbohydrates, 14% fat, 20% protein, and 3% water (table). It contains several minerals in rich content (having a Daily Value of 20% or higher), including manganese, magnesium, phosphorus, potassium, iron, and zinc, while calcium levels are moderate (table).

== Flavonoids ==
Cocoa powder is rich in flavonoids (especially flavan-3-ols), a subset of polyphenols. The amount of flavonoids depends on the amount of processing and manufacturing the cocoa powder undergoes. Alkalization, also known as Dutch processing, causes its content of flavonoids to be substantially reduced.

== Safety ==
=== Cadmium content ===
Cocoa powders may contain cadmium, a toxic heavy metal, found naturally in high levels in the soil of some regions of cocoa-producing countries. The European Union has imposed a limit (as of January 1, 2019) for cadmium in cocoa powder of 0.6 μg per gram of cocoa powder and 0.8 μg per gram for chocolate with ≥ 50% total dry cocoa solids (fat and non-fat cocoa solids combined). In Canada, a daily serving of a natural health product must contain no more than 6 μg of cadmium for an individual weighing 150 pounds (68 kg) and 3 μg for a 75 lb (34 kg) individual. While the US government has not set a limit for cadmium in foods or health products, the state of California has established a maximum allowable daily level of oral cadmium exposure of 4.1 μg and requires products containing more than this amount per daily serving to bear a warning on the label.

== See also ==
- Baking chocolate
