= Chocolate liquor =

Pure cocoa mass in solid or semi-solid form

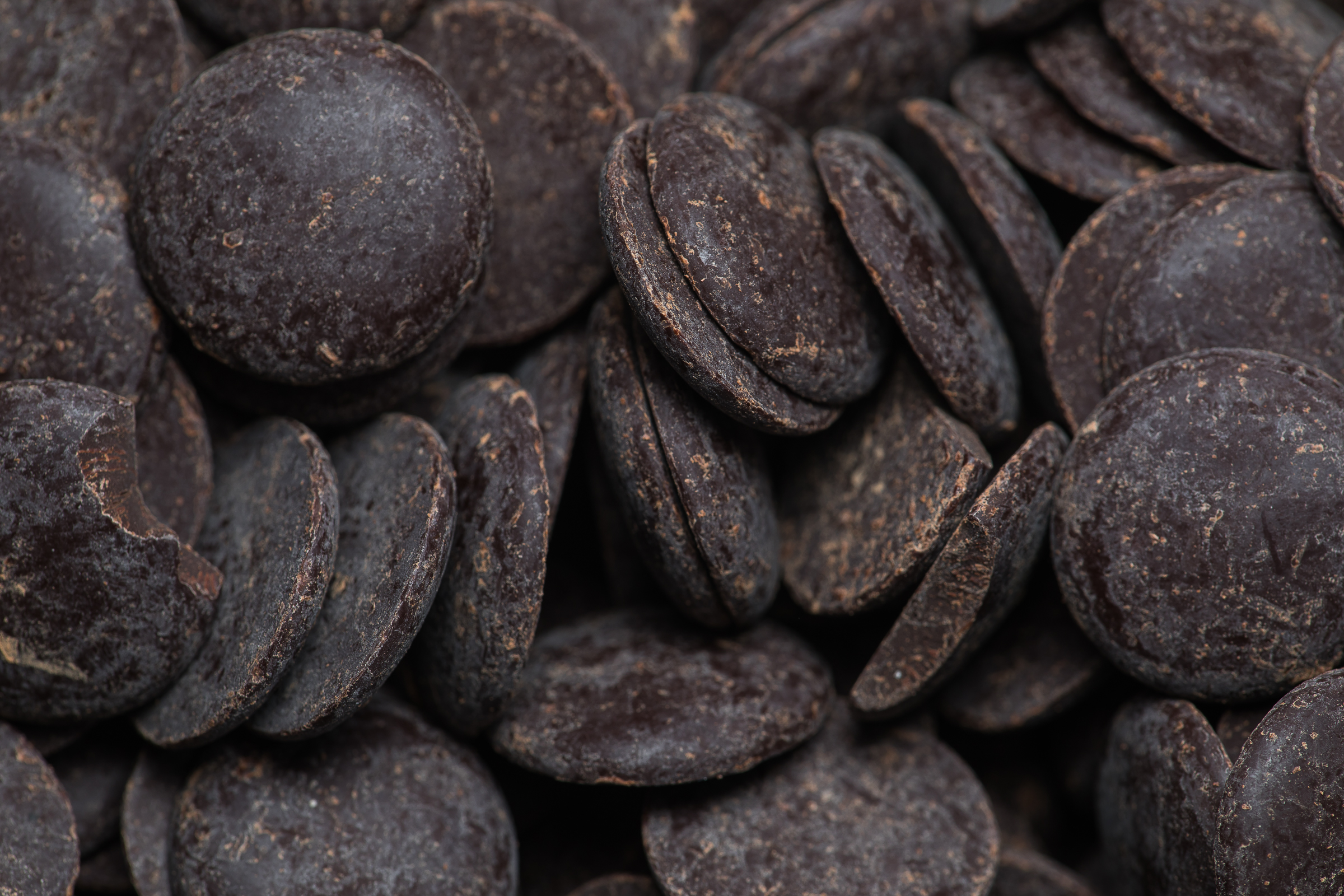
- Chocolate liquor wafers
- Alternative names: Cocoa liquor, cocoa paste, cocoa mass
- Type: Chocolate
- Main ingredients: Cocoa beans

Chocolate liquor, also called cocoa liquor, paste or mass, (Note: Rarely cocoa solids) is pure cocoa in liquid or semi-solid form. It is produced from cocoa bean nibs that have been fermented, dried, roasted, and separated from their skins. The nibs are ground to the point cocoa butter is released from the cells of the bean and melted, which turns cocoa into a paste and then into a free-flowing liquid.

The liquor is either cooled and molded into blocks, which can be used as unsweetened baking chocolate, or put under high pressure, separating out cocoa butter and leaving behind a dry cake of defatted cocoa. Its main use (often with additional cocoa butter) is in making chocolate.

In this context, the word liquor is not in reference to alcohol, but means 'a liquid' or 'a fluid'.

American legislation treats chocolate liquor as a chocolate product. European legislation treats it as a cocoa product until sugar is added. Unlike European chocolate, American chocolate was commonly manufactured without sugar in the 19th century.

Chocolate liquor contains roughly 53% cocoa butter (fat), 17% carbohydrates, 11% protein, 6% tannins, and 1.5% theobromine.

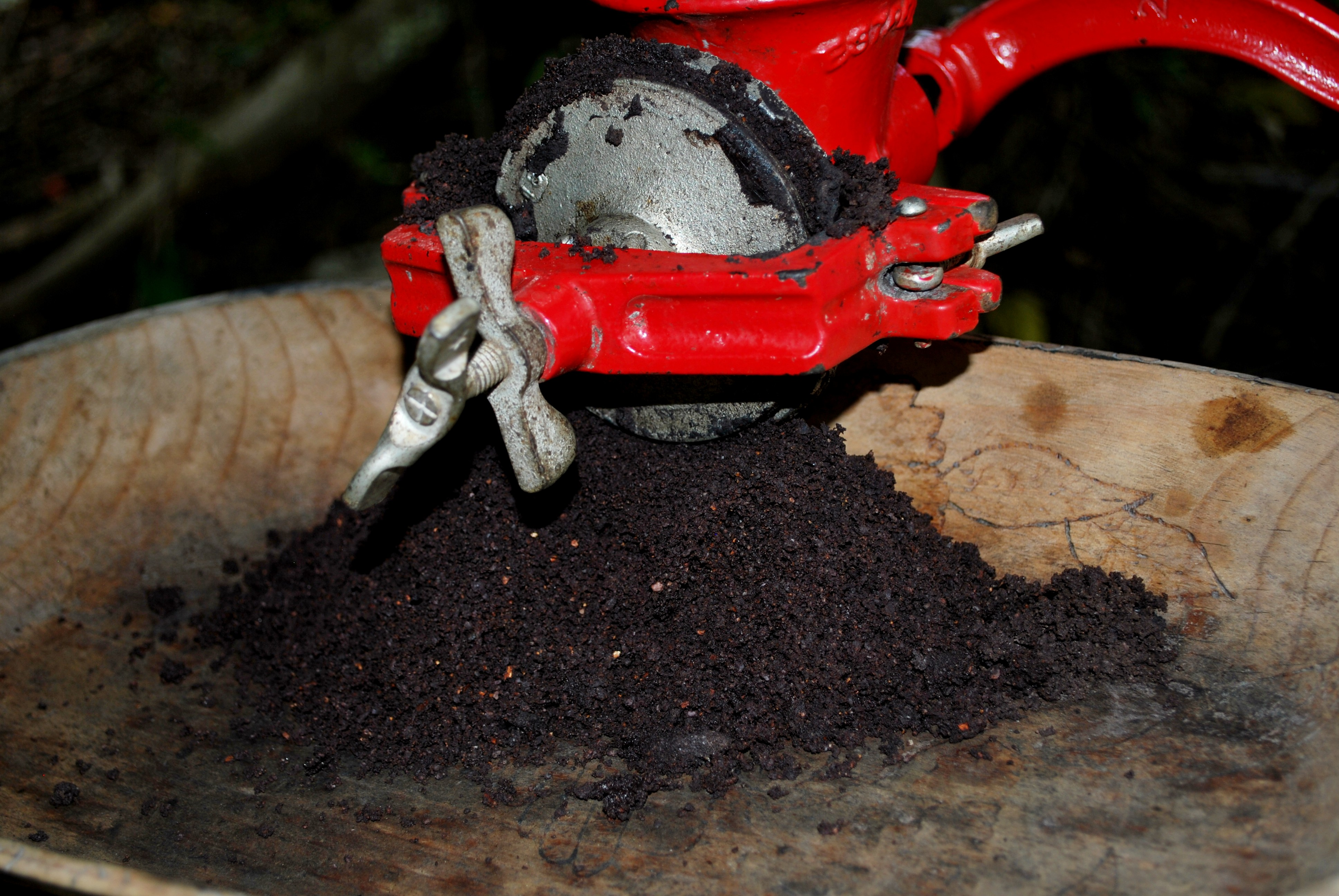
Manually ground cocoa

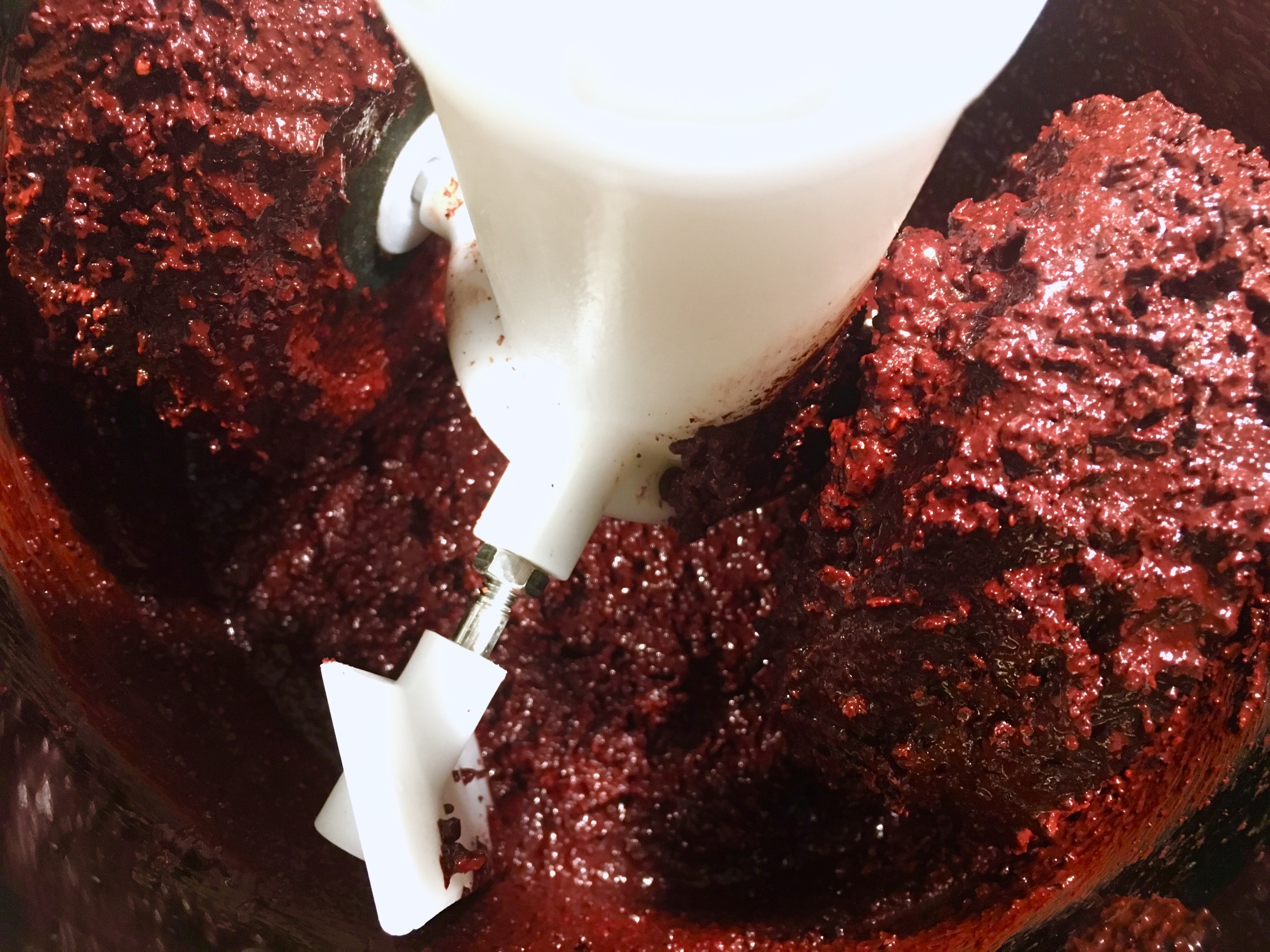
Cocoa turning into a paste in a melanger

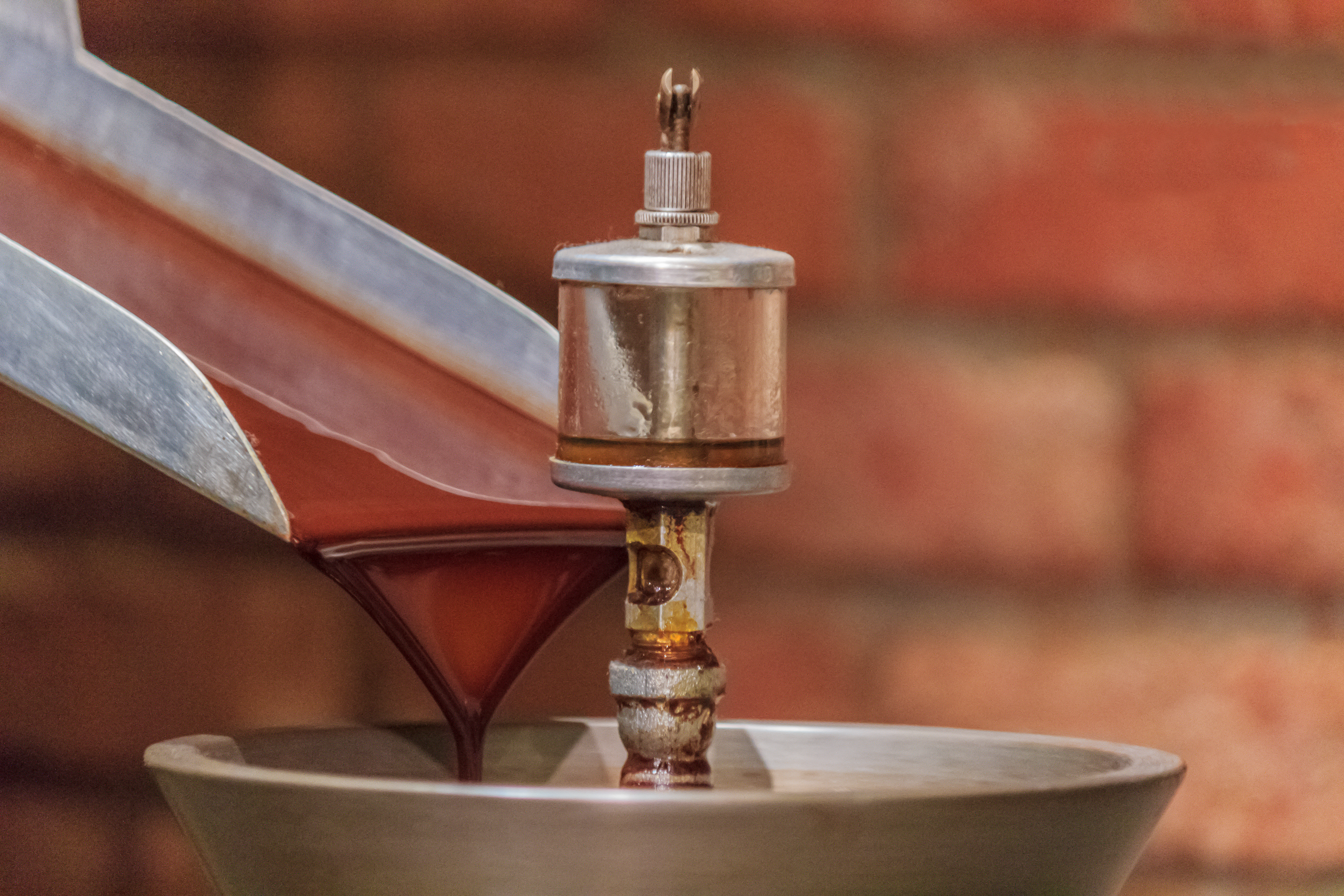
Fully ground cocoa exiting from a cocoa mill

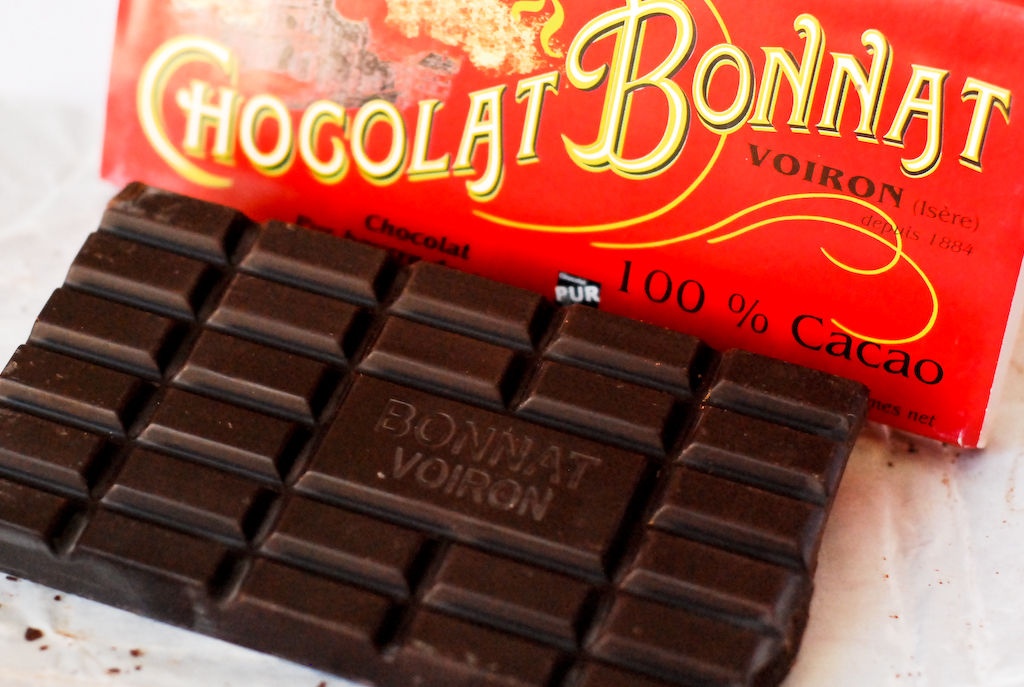
Tempered and molded cocoa liquor

== See also ==
- Types of chocolate
- Chocolate § Grinding and blending
