= Polycarbonate (functional group) =

A polycarbonate is an oxocarbon dianion consisting of a chain of carbonate units, where successive carbonyl groups are directly linked to each other by shared additional oxygen atoms. That is, they are the conjugate bases of polycarbonic acids, the conceptual anhydrides of carbonic acid, or polymers of carbon dioxide. They have the structure ^{–}O[(C=O)–O]_{n}^{–} and the molecular formula [C_{n}O_{2n+1}]^{2–}.

Whereas the carbonate dianion itself is well known, as found in many salts, many organic compounds containing esters of it have been made, and the parent carbonic acid is also well-known, higher homologs are substantially less stable. Only a few examples of covalent dicarbonate and tricarbonate structures and ionic dicarbonate salts have been made and their conjugate acids have only been studied theoretically. Polycarbonates up to n=6 have been studied theoretically, with the dianions being only metastable but stabilized when paired with metal counterions or as their conjugate acids.

Di-tert-butyl tricarbonate extrudes carbon dioxide in the presence of various catalysts to form di-tert-butyl dicarbonate. Long-chain carbon dioxide oligomers are likewise expected to decompose exothermically.

Polycarbonates and their conjugate acids
Carbonate units	(Poly)carbonate	(Poly)carbonic acid
1	$\ce{ ^- O-\overset{\displaystyle O \atop \| }{C}-O^-}$ Carbonate	$\ce{ HO-\overset{\displaystyle O \atop \| }{C}-OH}$ Carbonic acid
2	$\ce{ ^- O-\overset{\displaystyle O \atop \| }{C}-O-\overset{\displaystyle O \atop \| }{C}-O^-}$ Dicarbonate	$\ce{ HO-\overset{\displaystyle O \atop \| }{C}-O-\overset{\displaystyle O \atop \| }{C}-OH}$ Dicarbonic acid
3	$\ce{ ^- O-\overset{\displaystyle O \atop \| }{C}-O-\overset{\displaystyle O \atop \| }{C}-O-\overset{\displaystyle O \atop \| }{C}-O^-}$ Tricarbonate	$\ce{ HO-\overset{\displaystyle O \atop \| }{C}-O-\overset{\displaystyle O \atop \| }{C}-O-\overset{\displaystyle O \atop \| }{C}-OH}$ Tricarbonic acid
4	$\ce{ ^- O-\overset{\displaystyle O \atop \| }{C}-O-\overset{\displaystyle O \atop \| }{C}-O-\overset{\displaystyle O \atop \| }{C}-O-\overset{\displaystyle O \atop \| }{C}-O^-}$ Tetracarbonate	$\ce{ HO-\overset{\displaystyle O \atop \| }{C}-O-\overset{\displaystyle O \atop \| }{C}-O-\overset{\displaystyle O \atop \| }{C}-O-\overset{\displaystyle O \atop \| }{C}-OH}$ Tetracarbonic acid
5	$\ce{ ^- O-\overset{\displaystyle O \atop \| }{C}-O-\overset{\displaystyle O \atop \| }{C}-O-\overset{\displaystyle O \atop \| }{C}-O-\overset{\displaystyle O \atop \| }{C}-O-\overset{\displaystyle O \atop \| }{C}-O^-}$ Pentacarbonate	$\ce{ HO-\overset{\displaystyle O \atop \| }{C}-O-\overset{\displaystyle O \atop \| }{C}-O-\overset{\displaystyle O \atop \| }{C}-O-\overset{\displaystyle O \atop \| }{C}-O-\overset{\displaystyle O \atop \| }{C}-OH}$ Pentacarbonic acid
6	$\ce{ ^- O-\overset{\displaystyle O \atop \| }{C}-O-\overset{\displaystyle O \atop \| }{C}-O-\overset{\displaystyle O \atop \| }{C}-O-\overset{\displaystyle O \atop \| }{C}-O-\overset{\displaystyle O \atop \| }{C}-O-\overset{\displaystyle O \atop \| }{C}-O^-}$ Hexacarbonate	$\ce{ HO-\overset{\displaystyle O \atop \| }{C}-O-\overset{\displaystyle O \atop \| }{C}-O-\overset{\displaystyle O \atop \| }{C}-O-\overset{\displaystyle O \atop \| }{C}-O-\overset{\displaystyle O \atop \| }{C}-O-\overset{\displaystyle O \atop \| }{C}-OH}$ Hexacarbonic acid
