= Dicarbonate =

Dicarbonate ion
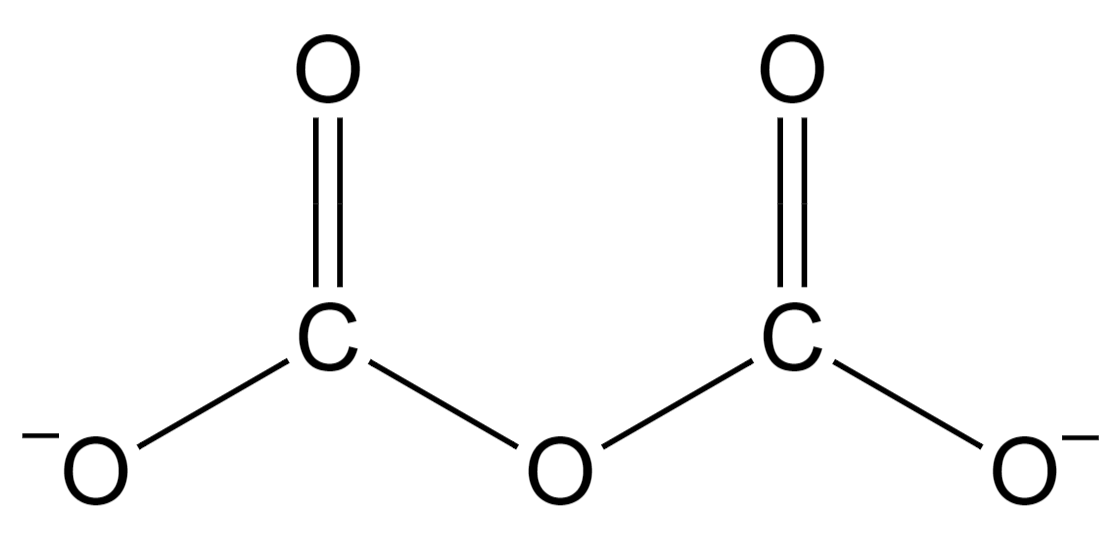

Names
- IUPAC name Dicarbonate
- Other names Pyrocarbonate

Identifiers
| CAS Number | 214335-04-3 |
| 3D model (JSmol) | Interactive image |
| ChemSpider | 10616988 |
| MeSH | pyrocarbonate |
| PubChem CID | 15238643 |
| CompTox Dashboard (EPA) | DTXSID30570367 |
- InChI: InChI=1S/C2H2O5/c3-1(4)7-2(5)6/h(H,3,4)(H,5,6)/p-2 Key: ZFTFAPZRGNKQPU-UHFFFAOYSA-L
- SMILES: C(=O)([O-])OC(=O)[O-]

Properties
| Chemical formula | C_{2}O^{2−}_{5} |
| Molar mass | 104.017 g·mol^{−1} |
- Except where otherwise noted, data are given for materials in their standard state (at 25 °C [77 °F], 100 kPa). Infobox references

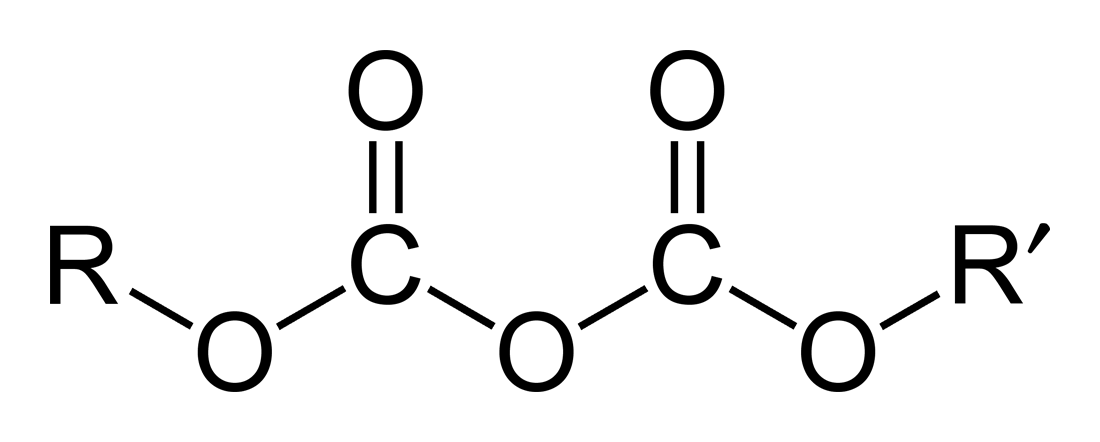
The general structure of dicarbonate esters

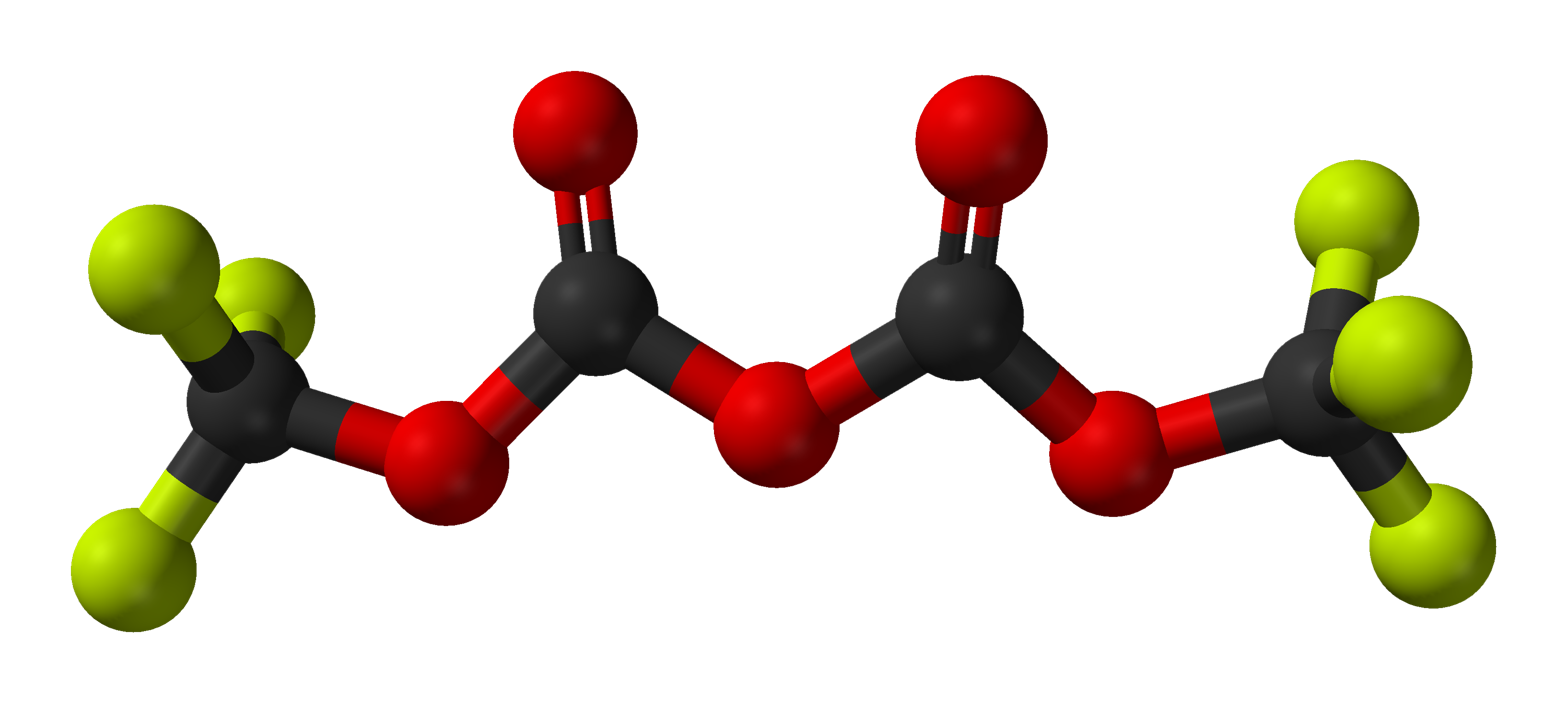
Molecular structure of bis(trifluoromethyl) dicarbonate

A dicarbonate, also known as a pyrocarbonate, is a chemical containing the divalent −O−C(=O)−O−C(=O)−O− or −C_{2}O_{5}− functional group, which consists of two carbonate groups sharing an oxygen atom. It is one of polycarbonate functional groups. These compounds can be viewed as derivatives of the hypothetical compound dicarbonic acid, HO−C(=O)−O−C(=O)−OH or H_{2}C_{2}O_{5}. Three important organic compounds containing this group are:

- dimethyl dicarbonate H_{3}C−C_{2}O_{5}−CH_{3}
- diethyl dicarbonate C_{2}H_{5}−C_{2}O_{5}−C_{2}H_{5}
- di-tert-butyl dicarbonate (H_{3}C−)_{3}C−C_{2}O_{5}−C(−CH_{3})_{3}, also known as Boc anhydride.

It is one of the oxocarbon anions, consisting solely of oxygen and carbon. The anion has the formula ^{−}O−C(=O)−O−C(=O)−O^{−} or C_{2}O^{2−}_{5}. Dicarbonate salts are apparently unstable at ambient conditions, but can be made under pressure and may have a fleeting existence in carbonate solutions.

The term dicarbonate is sometimes used erroneously to refer to bicarbonate, the common name of the hydrogencarbonate anion HCO^{−}_{3} or esters of the hydrogencarbonate functional group −O−C(=O)−OH. It is also sometimes used for chemicals that contain two carbonate units in their covalent structure or stoichiometric formula.

== Inorganic salts ==
PbC_{2}O_{5} (lead(II) dicarbonate) can be formed at 30 GPa and 2000K from PbCO_{3} and CO_{2}. It forms white monoclinic crystals, with space group P2_{1}/c and four formula units per unit cell. At 30 GPa the unit cell has a=4.771 b=8.079 c=7.070 Å and β=91.32°. The unit cell volume is 272.4 Å^{3} and density 7.59.

SrC_{2}O_{5} (strontium dicarbonate) is very similar to the lead compound, and also has monoclinic structure with space group P2_{1}/c and four formula units per unit cell. At 30 GPa the unit cell has a=4.736 b=8.175 c=7.140 Å and β=91.34°. The unit cell volume is 276.3 Å^{3} and density 4.61. The double Sr=O bonds have lengths of 1.22, 1.24, and 1.25 Å. The single Sr-O bonds have lengths of 1.36 and 1.41 Å. The angles subtended at the carbon atoms are slightly less than 120°, and the angle at the C-O-C is larger.

== See also ==
- Tricarbonate
- Peroxodicarbonate
- Oxalate
- Pyrosulfate
- Peroxydisulfate
- Dithionate
- Trithionate
- Tetrathionate
- Pyrophosphate
- Polyphosphate
