= Rubidium oxalate =

Identifiers
CAS Number	10010-65-8 anhydrous; 7243-75-6 monohydrate
3D model (JSmol)	Interactive image
ChemSpider	10760835
PubChem CID	13955568
- InChI: InChI=1S/C2H2O4.2Rb/c3-1(4)2(5)6;;/h(H,3,4)(H,5,6);;/q;2*+1/p-2 Key: DUXDETQJUQZYEX-UHFFFAOYSA-L
- SMILES: [Rb+].[O-]C(=O)C(=O)[O-].[Rb+]

Properties
Chemical formula	Rb_{2}C_{2}O_{4}
Molar mass	258.954 g·mol^{−1}
Appearance	colourless crystals
Density	2.76 g/cm^{3} (monohydrate)
Solubility in water	soluble

Thermochemistry
Std enthalpy of formation (Δ_{f}H^{⦵}_{298})	1325.0 ± 8.1 kJ/mol

Related compounds
Other anions	Rubidium carbonate; Rubidium acetate
Other cations	Lithium oxalate; Sodium oxalate; Potassium oxalate; Caesium oxalate
Related compounds	Rubidium hydroxide; Oxalic acid
- Except where otherwise noted, data are given for materials in their standard state (at 25 °C [77 °F], 100 kPa). Infobox references

Rubidium oxalate is a chemical compound with the chemical formula Rb_{2}C_{2}O_{4}. It is a rubidium salt of oxalic acid. It consists of rubidium cations Rb^{+} and oxalate anions C_{2}O_{4}^{2−}. Rubidium oxalate forms a monohydrate Rb_{2}C_{2}O_{4}·H_{2}O.

== Structure ==
From an aqueous solution, rubidium oxalate crystallizes as a monohydrate Rb_{2}C_{2}O_{4}·H_{2}O in the monoclinic crystal system and is isomorphic to potassium oxalate monohydrate K_{2}C_{2}O_{4}·H_{2}O. Two forms of the anhydrous form (Rb_{2}C_{2}O_{4}) exist at room temperature: one form is monoclinic and isotypic to caesium oxalate (Cs_{2}C_{2}O_{4}), the other is orthorhombic and isotypic to potassium oxalate (K_{2}C_{2}O_{4}). Freshly prepared anhydrous rubidium oxalate initially contains mainly the monoclinic form, but this slowly transforms irreversibly into the orthorhombic form. In 2004, two more high-temperature forms of rubidium oxalate were discovered.

Crystal data of the different forms of rubidium oxalate

Form	Crystal system	Space group	a in Å	b in Å	c in Å	β	Z
Alpha	monoclinic	P2_{1}/c	6.328	10.455	8.217	98.016°	4
Beta	orthorhombic	Pbam	11.288	6.295	3.622	—	2
Monohydrate	monoclinic	C2/c	9.617	6.353	11.010	109.46°	4

== Preparation ==
Rubidium carbonate and oxalic acid react to form rubidium oxalate:

Rb_{2}CO_{3} + H_{2}C_{2}O_{4} → Rb_{2}C_{2}O_{4} + H_{2}O + CO_{2}↑

Rubidium oxalate can also be obtained via the thermal decomposition of rubidium formate:

2 HCOORb → Rb_{2}C_{2}O_{4} + H_{2}↑

== Reactions ==
The decomposition of rubidium oxalate with the release of carbon monoxide and subsequently carbon dioxide and oxygen takes place at 507–527 °C (945–981 °F; 780–800 K).

Rb_{2}C_{2}O_{4} → Rb_{2}CO_{3} + CO↑

Rb_{2}CO_{3} → Rb_{2}O + CO_{2}↑

2 Rb_{2}O → 4 Rb + O_{2}↑

Upon evaporation of a solution in hydrogen peroxide, rubidium oxalate forms a monoperhydrate of the formula Rb_{2}C_{2}O_{4}·H_{2}O_{2}, which forms monoclinic crystals that are relatively stable in air.

Rubidium oxalate reacts with hydrogen fluoride to form a hydrofluoridate salt (RbHC_{2}O_{4}·HF):

Rb_{2}C_{2}O_{4} + 2 HF → RbHC_{2}O_{4}·HF + RbF

== Related compounds ==
In addition to the neutral rubidium oxalate Rb_{2}C_{2}O_{4}, there is also an acidic salt, rubidium hydrogen oxalate with the formula RbHC_{2}O_{4}, which is isomorphic to potassium hydrogen oxalate KHC_{2}O_{4} and forms monoclinic crystals, and an acidic dioxalate with the formula RbHC_{2}O_{4}·H_{2}C_{2}O_{4}, which exists as a dihydrate, has a density of 2.125 g/cm^{3} at 18 °C and a solubility of 21 g/L at 21 °C.
