= Tricarbonate =

Tricarbonate ion
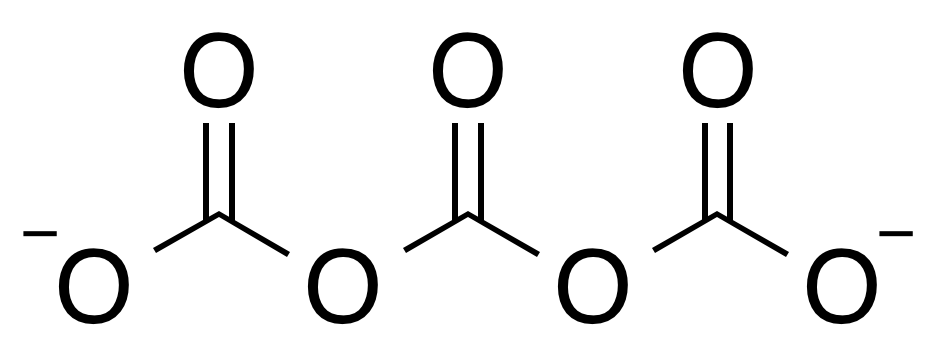

Names
- IUPAC name Tricarbonate

Identifiers
3D model (JSmol)	Interactive image
PubChem CID	57494228
- InChI: InChI=1S/C3H2O7/c4-1(5)9-3(8)10-2(6)7/h(H,4,5)(H,6,7)/p-2 Key: SYHPANJAVIEQQL-UHFFFAOYSA-L
- SMILES: [O-]C(=O)OC(=O)OC(=O)[O-]

Properties
Chemical formula	C_{3}O^{2−}_{7}
Molar mass	148.026 g·mol^{−1}

Structure
Molecular shape	Trigonal planar at carbon atoms

Related compounds
Related compounds	Carbonate; Bicarbonate; Dicarbonate
- Except where otherwise noted, data are given for materials in their standard state (at 25 °C [77 °F], 100 kPa). Infobox references

In organic chemistry, a tricarbonate is a compound containing the divalent −O−C(=O)−O−C(=O)−O−C(=O)−O− functional group, which consists of three carbonate groups linked in a chain by sharing of oxygen atoms. These compounds can be viewed as derivatives of a hypothetical tricarbonic acid, HO−C(=O)−O−C(=O)−O−C(=O)−OH. An important example is di-tert-butyl tricarbonate (H_{3}C−)_{3}C−C_{3}O_{7}−C(−CH_{3})_{3}, an intermediate in the synthesis of di-tert-butyl dicarbonate.

The term tricarbonate is sometimes used for salts that contain three carbonate dianions in their covalent structure or stoichiometric formula, such as cerium tricarbonate Ce_{2}(CO_{3})_{3}.

== See also ==
- Dicarbonate
