= Peroxydicarbonate =

Names
- Other names Peroxodicarbonate

Identifiers
CAS Number	34099-48-4; acid: 27641-41-4
3D model (JSmol)	Interactive image; acid: Interactive image
ChemSpider	acid: 7991058
PubChem CID	21867852
UNII	acid: IY72HZ278M
CompTox Dashboard (EPA)	DTXSID70619108
- InChI: InChI=1S/C2H2O6/c3-1(4)7-8-2(5)6/h(H,3,4)(H,5,6)/p-2 Key: XYXGFHALMTXBQX-UHFFFAOYSA-L; acid: InChI=1S/C2H2O6/c3-1(4)7-8-2(5)6/h(H,3,4)(H,5,6)
- SMILES: [O-]C(=O)OOC([O-])=O; acid: O=C(O)OOC(=O)O

Properties
Chemical formula	C_{2}O_{6}^{2−}
Molar mass	120.017 g·mol^{−1}
- Except where otherwise noted, data are given for materials in their standard state (at 25 °C [77 °F], 100 kPa). Infobox references

In chemistry, peroxydicarbonate (sometimes peroxodicarbonate) is a divalent anion with the chemical formula C_{2}O^{2−}_{6}. It is one of the oxocarbon anions, which consist solely of carbon and oxygen. Its molecular structure can be viewed as two carbonate anions joined so as to form a peroxide bridge –O–O–.

The anion is formed, together with peroxocarbonate CO^{2−}_{4}, at the negative electrode during electrolysis of molten lithium carbonate. The anion can also be obtained by electrolysis of a saturated solution of rubidium carbonate in water.

In addition, the peroxodicarbonate anion can be obtained by electrosynthesis on boron doped diamond (BDD) during water oxidation. The formal oxidation of two carbonate ions takes place at the anode. Due to the high oxidation potential of the peroxodicarbonate anion, a high anodic overpotential is necessary. This is even more important if hydroxyl radicals are involved in the formation process. Recent publications show that a concentration of 282 mmol/L of peroxodicarbonate can be reached in an undivided cell with sodium carbonate as starting material at current densities of 720 mA/cm^{2}. The described process is suitable for the pilot scale production of sodium peroxodicarbonate.

Potassium peroxydicarbonate K_{2}C_{2}O_{6} was obtained by Constam and von Hansen in 1895; its crystal structure was determined only in 2002. It too can be obtained by electrolysis of a saturated potassium carbonate solution at −20 °C. It is a light blue crystalline solid that decomposes at 141 °C, releasing oxygen and carbon dioxide, and decomposes slowly at lower temperatures.

Rubidium peroxodicarbonate is a light blue crystalline solid that decomposes at 424 K (151 °C). Its structure was published in 2003. In both salts, each of the two carbonate units is planar. In the rubidium salt the whole molecule is planar, whereas in the potassium salt the two units lie on different and nearly perpendicular planes, both of which contain the O–O bond.

== See also ==
- Dicarbonate
- Sodium percarbonate
