= 4-Bromothiophenol =

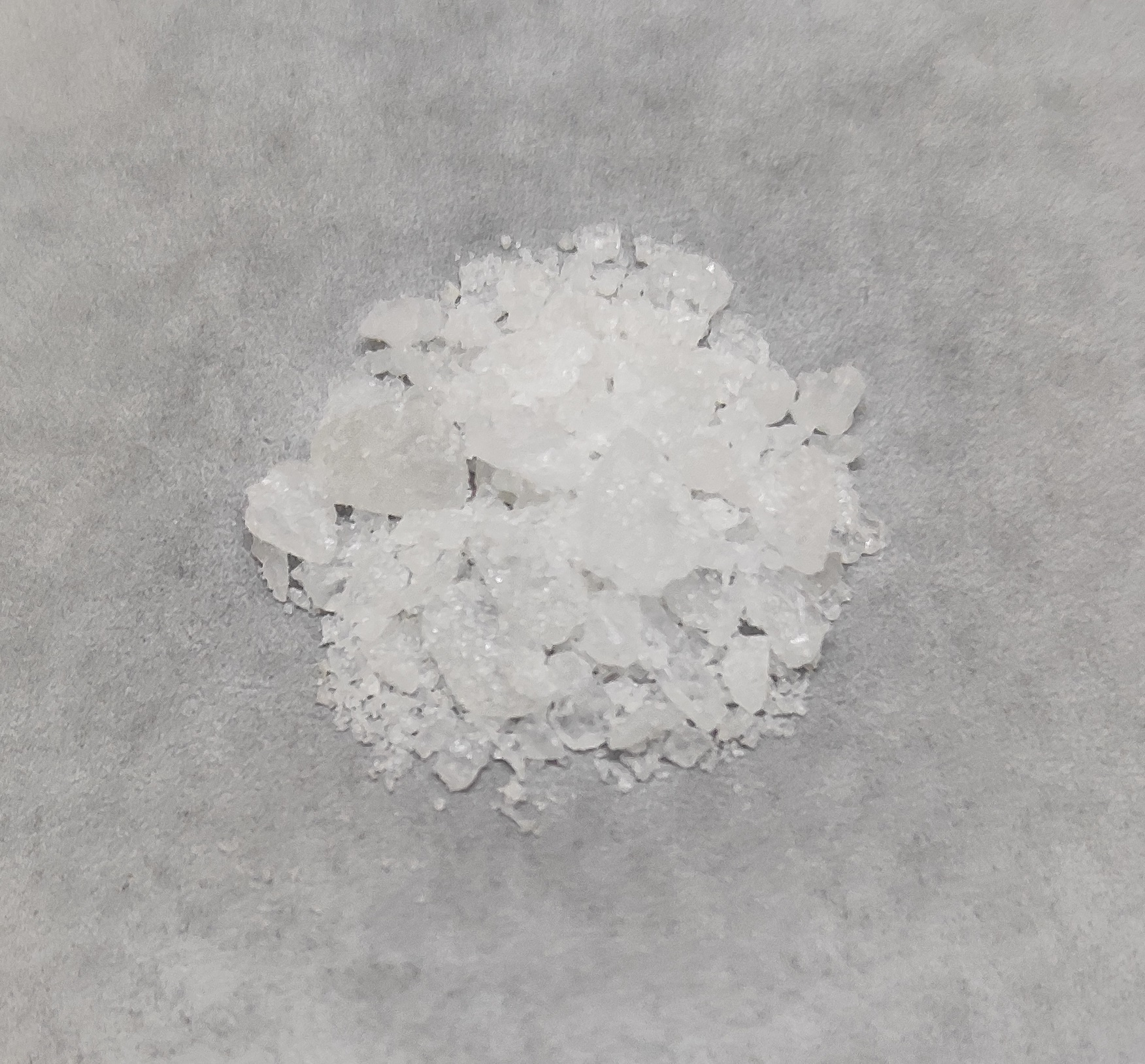

Names
- Preferred IUPAC name 4-Bromobenzene-1-thiol
- Other names p-bromothiophenol 1-bromo-4-mercaptobenzene

Identifiers
CAS Number	106-53-6
3D model (JSmol)	Interactive image
ChEMBL	ChEMBL278240
ChemSpider	59439
ECHA InfoCard	100.003.099
EC Number	203-407-3
PubChem CID	66049
UNII	P3WUO03X17
CompTox Dashboard (EPA)	DTXSID8059340
- InChI: InChI=1S/C6H5BrS/c7-5-1-3-6(8)4-2-5/h1-4,8H Key: FTBCOQFMQSTCQQ-UHFFFAOYSA-N
- SMILES: C1=CC(=CC=C1S)Br

Properties
Chemical formula	C_{6}H_{5}BrS
Molar mass	189.07 g·mol^{−1}
Appearance	Colorless crystals
Melting point	72-74 °C
Boiling point	230.5 °C

Hazards
- GHS labelling
Pictograms	(GHS05: Corrosive) (GHS06: Toxic) (GHS07: Exclamation mark)
Signal word	Danger
Hazard statements	H301, H314, H315, H319, H335
Precautionary statements	P260, P264, P270, P271, P280, P301+P310, P301+P330+P331, P302+P352, P303+P361+P353, P304+P340, P305+P351+P338, P310, P312, P321, P330, P332+P313, P337+P313, P362, P363, P403+P233, P405, P501
- Except where otherwise noted, data are given for materials in their standard state (at 25 °C [77 °F], 100 kPa). Infobox references

4-Bromothiophenol is an organic compound with the formula BrC_{6}H_{4}SH. It forms colorless crystals.

== Synthesis ==
4-Bromothiophenol can be synthesized via the reduction of 4-bromo-benzenesulfonyl chloride by red phosphorus and iodine in an acidic solution. Hydrogenation of 4,4'-dibromodiphenyl disulfide also produces 4-bromothiophenol.

== Reactions ==
It reacts with acetylacetone in the presence of cesium carbonate to give 3-(4-bromophenylthio)pentane-2,4-dione. 4,4'-Dibromophenyl disulfide is also produced as the intermediate.

Like other thiols, it reacts with silver nitrate to produce silver 4-bromothiophenolate.
