= C8H14O6 =

The molecular formula C_{8}H_{14}O_{6} may refer to:

- Diethyl tartrate, organic compound with the formula (HOCHCO_{2}Et)_{2}
- Dipropyl peroxydicarbonate, organic peroxide
