= Sodium peroxycarbonate =

Chemical compound

Sodium peroxycarbonate or sodium percarbonate, sodium permonocarbonate is a chemical compound, a peroxycarbonate of sodium, with formula Na_{2}CO_{4}

== See also ==
- Sodium percarbonate
- Peroxycarbonate
