= Caesium oxalate =

Names
- IUPAC name Caesium oxalate
- Preferred IUPAC name Dicaesium oxalate

Identifiers
CAS Number	1068-63-9
3D model (JSmol)	Interactive image
ChemSpider	10760846
ECHA InfoCard	100.012.683
EC Number	213-950-8
PubChem CID	13628982
UNII	KB9QB78M28
CompTox Dashboard (EPA)	DTXSID401336476
- InChI: InChI=1S/C2H2O4.2Cs/c3-1(4)2(5)6;;/h(H,3,4)(H,5,6);;/q;2*+1/p-2 Key: HEQUOWMMDQTGCX-UHFFFAOYSA-L
- SMILES: C(=O)(C(=O)[O-])[O-].[Cs+].[Cs+]

Properties
Chemical formula	Cs_{2}C_{2}O_{4}
Molar mass	353.829 g·mol^{−1}
Appearance	White solid
Solubility in water	76 g/(100 ml) (25 °C)

Hazards
- GHS labelling
Pictograms	(GHS07: Exclamation mark)
Signal word	Warning
Hazard statements	H302, H312
Precautionary statements	P264, P270, P280, P301+P312, P302+P352, P312, P322, P330, P363, P501
- Except where otherwise noted, data are given for materials in their standard state (at 25 °C [77 °F], 100 kPa). Infobox references

Caesium oxalate (standard IUPAC spelling), or dicesium oxalate, or cesium oxalate (American spelling) is a chemical compound with the chemical formula Cs_{2}C_{2}O_{4}. It is a caesium salt of oxalic acid. It consists of caesium cations Cs^{+} and oxalate anions C_{2}O^{2−}_{4}.

== Preparation ==
Caesium oxalate can be prepared by passing carbon monoxide and carbon dioxide over caesium carbonate at 380 °C:

Cs_{2}CO_{3} + CO → Cs_{2}C_{2}O_{4}

Other alkali carbonates do not undergo transformation to oxalate.

Caesium carbonate can react with oxalic acid in aqueous solution to give caesium oxalate.

Cs_{2}CO_{3} + H_{2}C_{2}O_{4}·2H_{2}O → Cs_{2}C_{2}O_{4}·H_{2}O + CO_{2} + 2 H_{2}O

== Reactions ==
Caesium oxalate can be reduced back into caesium carbonate and carbon monoxide by thermal decomposition.

Cs_{2}C_{2}O_{4} → Cs_{2}CO_{3} + CO

== Double salts ==
Compounds that contain caesium and another element in addition to the oxalate anion are double salts of caesium and oxalate. The oxalate may form a complex with a metal that can make a salt with caesium.

Examples include:

name	formula	properties	reference
caesium bis(oxalato)oxotitanate(IV) trihydrate	Cs_{4}[TiO(C_{2}O_{4})_{2}]_{2}·3H_{2}O		
caesium oxalatooxovanadate(IV)	Cs_{2}[VO(C_{2}O_{4})_{2}]		
caesium tris(oxalato) ferrate(III) dihydrate	Cs_{3}[Fe(C_{2}O_{4})_{3}]·2H_{2}O		
caesium bis(oxalato) cobaltate(II) tetrahydrate	Cs_{2}[Co(C_{2}O_{4})_{2}]·4H_{2}O		
caesium bis(oxalato)nickelate(III) tetrahydrate	Cs[Ni(C_{2}O_{4})_{2}]·4H_{2}O		
caesium tris(oxalato)germanate(IV)	Cs_{2}[Ge(C_{2}O_{4})_{3}]		
caesium yttrium(III) oxalate monohydrate	CsY(C_{2}O_{4})_{2}·H_{2}O	monoclinic a = 8.979, b = 6.2299, c = 8.103 Å, β = 90.05° V = 453.3 Å^{3}, space group P2/n	
caesium (diaquo)bis(oxalato)oxoniobate(V) dihydrate	Cs[NbO(C_{2}O_{4})_{2}(H_{2}O)_{2}]·2H_{2}O		
	Cs_{2}[NH_{4}]_{2}[Mo_{3}O_{8}(C_{2}O_{4})_{3}]		
tetracaesium dilanthanum(III) oxalate octahydrate	Cs_{4}La_{2}(C_{2}O_{4})_{5}·8H_{2}O		
tetracaesium dipraseodymium(III) oxalate octahydrate	Cs_{4}Pr_{2}(C_{2}O_{4})_{5}·8H_{2}O		
caesium neodymium(III) oxalate hexahydrate	CsNd(C_{2}O_{4})_{2}·6H_{2}O		
caesium samarium(III) oxalate hexahydrate	CsSm(C_{2}O_{4})_{2}·6H_{2}O		
caesium dysprosium(III) oxalate hydrate	CsDy(C_{2}O_{4})_{2}·?H_{2}O		
caesium gadolinium(III) oxalate sesquihydrate	CsGd(C_{2}O_{4})_{2}·1.5H_{2}O		
caesium terbium(III) oxalate sesquihydrate	CsTb(C_{2}O_{4})_{2}·1.5H_{2}O		
caesium dysprosium(III) oxalate sesquihydrate	CsDy(C_{2}O_{4})_{2}·1.5H_{2}O		
caesium holmium(III) oxalate sesquihydrate	CsHo(C_{2}O_{4})_{2}·1.5H_{2}O		
caesium ytterbium(III) oxalate sesquihydrate	CsYb(C_{2}O_{4})_{2}·1.5H_{2}O		
caesium lutetium(III) oxalate sesquihydrate	CsLu(C_{2}O_{4})_{2}·1.5H_{2}O		
dicaesium dioxotungsten(VI) oxalate	Cs_{2}[WO_{2}](C_{2}O_{4})_{2}		
dicaesium dioxotungsten(VI) difluoride monooxalate	Cs_{2}[WO_{2}]F_{2}(C_{2}O_{4})		
caesium tris(oxalato)rhenate(III)	Cs_{3}[Re(C_{2}O_{4})_{3}]		
dicaesium uranyl monooxalate monosulfate dihydrate	Cs_{2}[UO_{2}](C_{2}O_{4})(SO_{4})·2H_{2}O		
ammonium caesium uranyl monooxalate monosulfate dihydrate	[NH_{4}]Cs[UO_{2}](C_{2}O_{4})(SO_{4})·2H_{2}O		
caesium dioxoneptunium(VI) oxalate hydrate	Cs[NpO_{2}]C_{2}O_{4}·nH_{2}O		

Mixed anion compounds containing caesium, oxalate and another anion also exist, such as the uranyl sulfate above, and caesium bis(oxalato)borate (CsBOB) (Cs[B(C_{2}O_{4})_{2}]).
