= Peroxycarbonate =

Polyatomic anion

α-Peroxycarbonate

Names
- Preferred IUPAC name Oxidocarbonate
- Systematic IUPAC name Oxocarbonate
- Other names Peroxycarbonate (Peroxocarbonate); Percarbonate; Peroxidocarboxylate; Peroxidoformate; Dioxidan-2-idecarboxylate

Identifiers
CAS Number	34099-49-5
3D model (JSmol)	Interactive image
ChemSpider	23255841
PubChem CID	15793132
CompTox Dashboard (EPA)	DTXSID00578375
- InChI: InChI=1S/CH2O4/c2-1(3)5-4/h4H,(H,2,3)/p-2 Key: MMCOUVMKNAHQOY-UHFFFAOYSA-L
- SMILES: C(=O)([O-])O[O-]

Properties
Chemical formula	CO_{4}^{2−}
Molar mass	76.008 g·mol^{−1}
- Except where otherwise noted, data are given for materials in their standard state (at 25 °C [77 °F], 100 kPa). Infobox references

In chemistry, peroxycarbonate (sometimes peroxocarbonate, IUPAC name: oxocarbonate or oxidocarbonate) or percarbonate is a divalent anion with formula CO^{2−}_{4}. It is an oxocarbon anion that consists solely of carbon and oxygen. It is the anion of peroxycarbonic acid also called hydroperoxyformic acid, HO−O−CO−OH.

The peroxycarbonate anion is formed, together with peroxydicarbonate C_{2}O^{2−}_{6}, at the negative electrode during electrolysis of molten lithium carbonate. Lithium peroxycarbonate can be produced also by combining carbon dioxide CO_{2} with lithium hydroxide in concentrated hydrogen peroxide H_{2}O_{2} at −10 °C.

Electrolysis of a solution of lithium carbonate at -30° to -40 °C yields a solution of the Lithium percarbonate, which can liberate iodine from potassium iodide instantaneously. The crystalline salt has not been isolated.

The peroxycarbonate anion has been proposed as an intermediate to explain the catalytic effect of CO_{2} on the oxidation of organic compounds by O_{2}.

The potassium and rubidium salts of the monovalent hydrogenperoxycarbonate anion (aka. hydroxycarbonate, biperoxycarbonate) H−O−O−CO^{−}_{2} have also been obtained.

== See also ==
- Sodium percarbonate, actually a perhydrate of sodium carbonate.
- Sodium peroxycarbonate
- Orthocarbonate anion CO^{4−}_{4}
- Dipropyl peroxydicarbonate
