= Caesium carbonate =

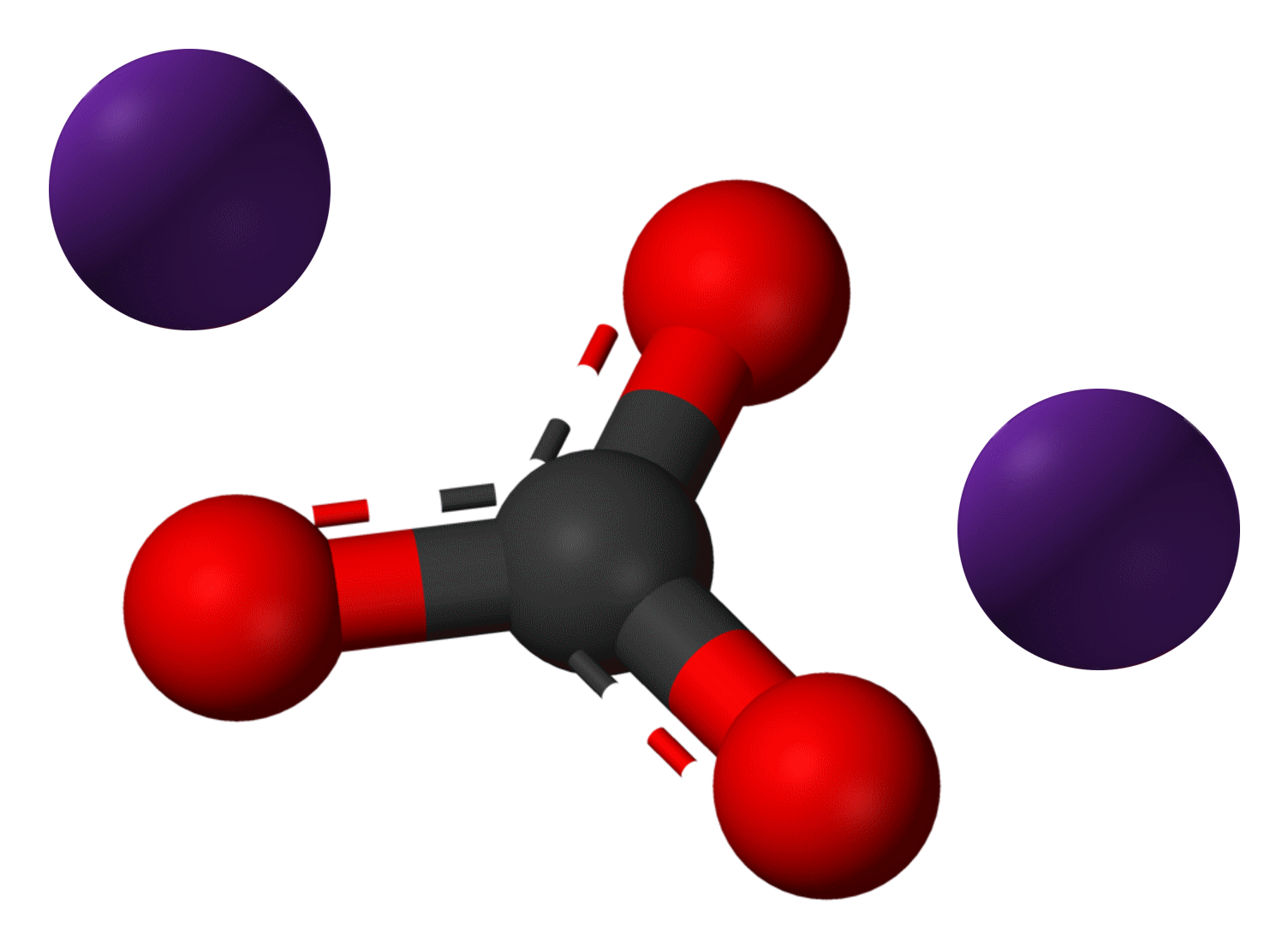
- Caesium, Cs Carbon, C Oxygen, O

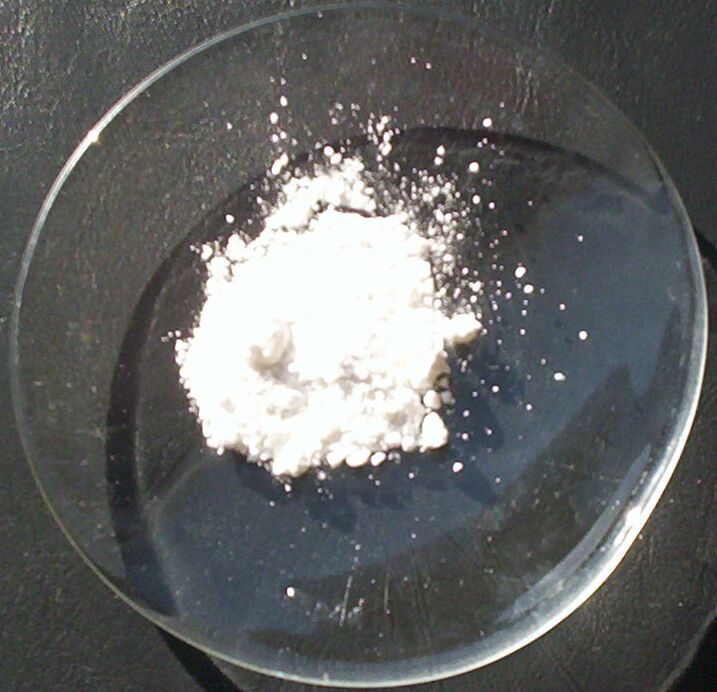

Names
- Preferred IUPAC name Dicaesium carbonate
- Other names: Caesium carbonate; Cesium carbonate

Identifiers
| CAS Number | 534-17-8 |
| 3D model (JSmol) | Interactive image |
| ChemSpider | 10339 |
| ECHA InfoCard | 100.007.812 |
| EC Number | 208-591-9 |
| PubChem CID | 10796 |
| UNII | QQI20A14P4 |
| CompTox Dashboard (EPA) | DTXSID0052178 |
- InChI: InChI=1S/CH2O3.2Cs/c2-1(3)4;;/h(H2,2,3,4);;/q;2*+1/p-2 Key: FJDQFPXHSGXQBY-UHFFFAOYSA-L; InChI=1/CH2O3.2Cs/c2-1(3)4;;/h(H2,2,3,4);;/q;2*+1/p-2 Key: FJDQFPXHSGXQBY-NUQVWONBAO
- SMILES: [Cs+].[Cs+].[O-]C([O-])=O

Properties
| Chemical formula | Cs_{2}CO_{3} |
| Molar mass | 325.819 g·mol^{−1} |
| Appearance | white powder |
| Density | 4.072 g/cm^{3} |
| Melting point | 610 °C (1,130 °F; 883 K) (decomposes) |
| Solubility in water | 2605 g/L (15 °C) |
| Solubility in ethanol | 110 g/L |
| Solubility in dimethylformamide | 119.6 g/L |
| Solubility in dimethyl sulfoxide | 361.7 g/L |
| Solubility in sulfolane | 394.2 g/L |
| Solubility in methylpyrrolidone | 723.3 g/L |
| Magnetic susceptibility (χ) | −103.6·10^{−6} cm^{3}/mol |

Hazards
- GHS labelling
| Pictograms | (GHS05: Corrosive) (GHS07: Exclamation mark) (GHS08: Health hazard) |
| Signal word | Danger |
| Hazard statements | H315, H318, H319, H335, H361f, H373 |
| Precautionary statements | P203, P260, P264, P264+P265, P271, P280, P302+P352, P304+P340, P305+P351+P338, P305+P354+P338, P317, P318, P319, P321, P332+P317, P337+P317, P362+P364, P403+P233, P405, P501 |
| Flash point | Non-flammable |

Related compounds
| Other anions | Caesium bicarbonate |
| Other cations | Lithium carbonate; Sodium carbonate; Potassium carbonate; Rubidium carbonate |
- Except where otherwise noted, data are given for materials in their standard state (at 25 °C [77 °F], 100 kPa). verify (what is ?) Infobox references

Caesium carbonate or cesium carbonate is a chemical compound with the chemical formula Cs_{2}CO_{3}. It is white crystalline solid. Caesium carbonate has a high solubility in polar solvents such as water, ethanol and DMF. Its solubility is higher in organic solvents compared to other carbonates like potassium carbonate and sodium carbonate, although it remains quite insoluble in other organic solvents such as toluene, p-xylene, and chlorobenzene. This compound is used in organic synthesis as a base. It also appears to have applications in energy conversion.

== Preparation ==
Caesium carbonate can be prepared by thermal decomposition of caesium oxalate. Upon heating, caesium oxalate is converted to caesium carbonate with emission of carbon monoxide.

Cs_{2}C_{2}O_{4} → Cs_{2}CO_{3} + CO

It can also be synthesized by reacting caesium hydroxide with carbon dioxide.

2 CsOH + CO_{2} → Cs_{2}CO_{3} + H_{2}O

== Reactions ==
Caesium carbonate facilitates the N-alkylation of compounds such as sulfonamides, amines, β-lactams, indoles, heterocyclic compounds, N-substituted aromatic imides, phthalimides, and other similar compounds.

Caesium carbonate and copper(II) chloride are used in the aerobic oxidation of primary alcohols.

Caesium carbonate can also be used in Suzuki, Heck, and Sonogashira coupling reactions.

Caesium carbonate produces carbonylation of alcohols and carbamination of amines more efficiently than some of the mechanisms that have been introduced in the past.

Caesium carbonate can be used for sensitive synthesis when a balanced strong base is needed.

== Use ==
=== Solar cells ===
Relatively effective polymer solar cells are built by thermal annealing of caesium carbonate. Caesium carbonate increases the energy effectiveness of the power conversion of solar cells and enhances the life times of the equipment. Studies done on UPS and XPS reveal that the system will do less work due to the thermal annealing of the Cs_{2}CO_{3} layer.

Caesium carbonate breaks down into Cs_{2}O and Cs_{2}O_{2} by thermal evaporation. It was suggested that, when Cs_{2}O combines with Cs_{2}O_{2} they produce n-type dopes that supply additional conducting electrons to the host devices. This produces a highly efficient inverted cell that can be used to further improve the efficiency of polymer solar cells or to design adequate multijunction photovoltaic cells.

The n-type semiconductor produced by thermal evaporation of Cs_{2}CO_{3} reacts intensively with metals like Al, and Ca in the cathode. This reaction will reduce the work on the cathode metals.

=== Organic electronic materials ===
Nanostructure layers of Cs_{2}CO_{3} can be used as cathodes for organic electronic materials due to their capacity to increase the kinetic energy of the electrons. Applications include photovoltaic studies, current-voltage measurements, UV photoelectron spectroscopy, X-ray photoelectron spectroscopy, and impedance spectroscopy.

Devices with Cs_{2}CO_{3} layers have produced equivalent power conversion efficiency compared to devices that use lithium fluoride.

=== OLEDs ===
Placing a Cs_{2}CO_{3} layer in between the cathode and the light-emitting polymer improves the efficiency of the white OLED.
