= Caesium bicarbonate =

Names
- IUPAC name Caesium hydrogencarbonate
- Other names: Cesium hydrogencarbonate; Cesium bicarbonate

Identifiers
CAS Number	15519-28-5
3D model (JSmol)	Interactive image
ChemSpider	2006316
ECHA InfoCard	100.035.943
PubChem CID	2734983
CompTox Dashboard (EPA)	DTXSID70165852
- InChI: InChI=1S/CH2O3.Cs/c2-1(3)4;/h(H2,2,3,4);/q;+1/p-1 Key: ZMCUDHNSHCRDBT-UHFFFAOYSA-M; InChI=1/CH2O3.Cs/c2-1(3)4;/h(H2,2,3,4);/q;+1/p-1 Key: ZMCUDHNSHCRDBT-REWHXWOFAQ
- SMILES: [Cs+].[O-]C(=O)O

Properties
Chemical formula	CsHCO_{3}
Molar mass	193.922 g/mol
Solubility in water	67.77 g/100 mL at 20°C

Hazards
- GHS labelling
Pictograms	(GHS07: Exclamation mark)
Signal word	Warning
Hazard statements	H319
Precautionary statements	P264+P265, P280, P305+P351+P338, P337+P317
- Except where otherwise noted, data are given for materials in their standard state (at 25 °C [77 °F], 100 kPa). Infobox references

Caesium bicarbonate or cesium bicarbonate is a chemical compound with the chemical formula CsHCO_{3}. It can be produced through the following reaction:

Cs_{2}CO_{3} + CO_{2} + H_{2}O → 2 CsHCO_{3}

The compound can be used for synthesizing caesium salts, but less common than caesium carbonate.

== General references ==
- Weast, Robert C., ed. (1981). CRC Handbook of Chemistry and Physics (62nd ed.). Boca Raton, Florida: CRC Press. p. B-91. ISBN 0-8493-0462-8.
