= Bicarbonate =

Polyatomic anion

- Skeletal formula of bicarbonate with the explicit hydrogen added

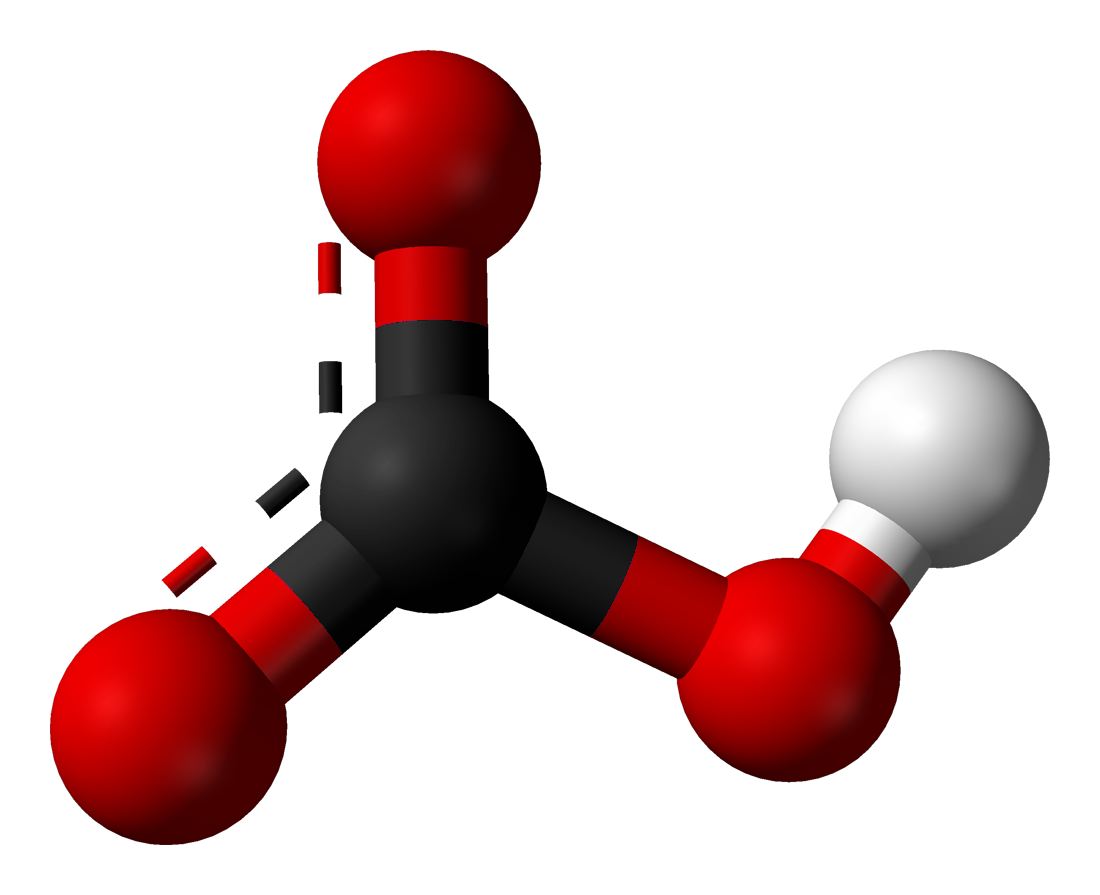
- Ball and stick model of bicarbonate

Names
- IUPAC name Hydrogencarbonate
- Systematic IUPAC name Hydroxidodioxidocarbonate(1−)
- Other names: Hydrogen carbonate; Hydrocarbonate

Identifiers
| CAS Number | 71-52-3 |
| 3D model (JSmol) | Interactive image |
| Beilstein Reference | 3903504 |
| ChEBI | CHEBI:17544 |
| ChEMBL | ChEMBL363707 |
| ChemSpider | 749 |
| Gmelin Reference | 49249 |
| KEGG | C00288 |
| PubChem CID | 769 |
| UNII | HN1ZRA3Q20 |
| CompTox Dashboard (EPA) | DTXSID2049921 |
- InChI: InChI=1S/CH2O3/c2-1(3)4/h(H2,2,3,4)/p-1 Key: BVKZGUZCCUSVTD-UHFFFAOYSA-M
- SMILES: OC([O-])=O

Properties
| Chemical formula | HCO_{3}^{−} |
| Molar mass | 61.0168 g mol^{−1} |
| log P | −0.82 |
| Acidity (pK_{a}) | 10.3 |
| Basicity (pK_{b}) | 7.7 |
| Conjugate acid | Carbonic acid |
| Conjugate base | Carbonate |
- Except where otherwise noted, data are given for materials in their standard state (at 25 °C [77 °F], 100 kPa). Infobox references

In inorganic chemistry, bicarbonate (American English: /baɪˈkɑːr.bə.neɪt/; IUPAC-recommended nomenclature: hydrogencarbonate) is an intermediate form in the deprotonation of carbonic acid. It is a polyatomic anion with the chemical formula HCO_{3}^{–}.

Bicarbonate serves a crucial biochemical role in the physiological pH buffering system.

The term "bicarbonate" was coined in 1814 by William Hyde Wollaston upon making the empirical observation that potassium bicarbonate (KHCO_{3}) liberates twice as much CO_{2} compared to potassium carbonate (K_{2}CO_{3}) upon heating. The name emerged during the study of factitious airs era when CO_{2} was first known as "fixed air" since 18th century scientists presumed the gas was affixed to certain solid matter. CO_{2} was later named carbonic acid by Lavoisier (unrelated to H_{2}CO_{3}), and based on the same logic as fixed air, K_{2}CO_{3} became known as carbonate of potash due to Lavoisier defining carbonates to be a salt of CO_{2} (carbonic acid) with a base. Wollaston then introduced the prefix bi- upon empirically measuring two parts CO_{2} per base released from KHCO_{3} which he named bicarbonate of potash to distinguish it from K_{2}CO_{3}. The nomenclature emerged before any molecular structures were understood and lives on as a trivial name despite modern chemistry language rendering the 18th-century chemical logic and nomenclature obsolete (see factitious airs for further details).

== Chemical properties ==
The bicarbonate ion (hydrogencarbonate ion) is an anion with the empirical formula HCO_{3}^{−} and a molecular mass of 61.01 daltons; it consists of one central carbon atom surrounded by three oxygen atoms in a trigonal planar arrangement, with a hydrogen atom attached to one of the oxygens. It is isoelectronic with nitric acid (HNO_{3}). The bicarbonate ion carries a negative one formal charge and is an amphiprotic species which has both acidic and basic properties. It is both the conjugate base of carbonic acid (H_{2}CO_{3}); and the conjugate acid of CO_{3}^{2−}, the carbonate ion, as shown by these equilibrium reactions:

CO_{3}^{2−} + 2 H_{2}O ⇌ HCO_{3}^{−} + H_{2}O + OH^{−} ⇌ H_{2}CO_{3} + 2 OH^{−}
H_{2}CO_{3} + 2 H_{2}O ⇌ HCO_{3}^{−} + H_{3}O^{+} + H_{2}O ⇌ CO_{3}^{2−} + 2 H_{3}O^{+}

A bicarbonate salt forms when a positively charged ion attaches to the negatively charged oxygen atoms of the ion, forming an ionic compound. Many bicarbonates are soluble in water at standard temperature and pressure; in particular, sodium bicarbonate contributes to total dissolved solids, a common parameter for assessing water quality.

== Physiological role ==
CO_{2} produced as a waste product of the oxidation of sugars in the mitochondria reacts with water in a reaction catalyzed by carbonic anhydrase to form H_{2}CO_{3}, which is in equilibrium with the cation H^{+} and anion HCO_{3}^{−}. It is then carried to the lung, where the reverse reaction occurs and CO_{2} gas is released. In the kidney (left), cells (green) lining the proximal tubule conserve bicarbonate by transporting it from the glomerular filtrate in the lumen (yellow) of the nephron back into the blood (red). The exact stoichiometry in the kidney is omitted for simplicity.

Bicarbonate is a vital component of the pH buffering system of the human body (maintaining acid–base homeostasis). 70%–75% of CO_{2} in the body is converted into carbonic acid (H_{2}CO_{3}), which is the conjugate acid of HCO_{3}^{−} and can quickly turn into it.

With carbonic acid as the central intermediate species, bicarbonate – in conjunction with water, hydrogen ions, and carbon dioxide – forms this buffering system, which is maintained at the volatile equilibrium required to provide prompt resistance to pH changes in both the acidic and basic directions. This is especially important for protecting tissues of the central nervous system, where pH changes too far outside of the normal range in either direction could prove disastrous (see acidosis or alkalosis). Recently it has been also demonstrated that cellular bicarbonate metabolism can be regulated by mTORC1 signaling.

Additionally, bicarbonate plays a key role in the digestive system. It raises the internal pH of the stomach, after highly acidic digestive juices have finished in their digestion of food. Bicarbonate also acts to regulate pH in the small intestine. It is released from the pancreas in response to the hormone secretin to neutralize the acidic chyme entering the duodenum from the stomach.

== Bicarbonate in the environment ==
Bicarbonate is the dominant form of dissolved inorganic carbon in sea water, and in most fresh waters. As such it is an important sink in the carbon cycle.

Some plants like Chara utilize carbonate and produce calcium carbonate (CaCO_{3}) as a result of biological metabolism.

In freshwater ecology, strong photosynthetic activity by freshwater plants in daylight releases gaseous oxygen into the water and at the same time produces bicarbonate ions. These shift the pH upward until in certain circumstances the degree of alkalinity can become toxic to some organisms or can make other chemical constituents such as ammonia toxic. In darkness, when no photosynthesis occurs, respiration processes release carbon dioxide, and no new bicarbonate ions are produced, resulting in a rapid fall in pH.

The flow of bicarbonate ions from rocks weathered by the carbonic acid in rainwater is an important part of the carbon cycle.

== Other uses ==
The most common salt of the bicarbonate ion is sodium bicarbonate, NaHCO_{3}, which is commonly known as baking soda. When heated or exposed to an acid such as acetic acid (vinegar), sodium bicarbonate releases carbon dioxide. This is used as a leavening agent in baking.

Ammonium bicarbonate is used in the manufacturing of some cookies, crackers, and biscuits.

== Diagnostics ==
In diagnostic medicine, the blood value of bicarbonate is one of several indicators of the state of acid–base physiology in the body. It is measured, along with chloride, potassium, and sodium, to assess electrolyte levels in an electrolyte panel test (which has Current Procedural Terminology, CPT, code 80051).

The parameter standard bicarbonate concentration (SBC_{e}) is the bicarbonate concentration in the blood at a P_{a}CO_{2} of 40 mmHg (5.33 kPa), full oxygen saturation and 36 °C.

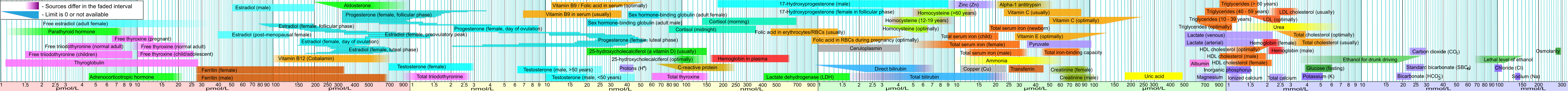
Reference ranges for blood tests, comparing blood content of bicarbonate (shown in blue at right) with other constituents.

== Bicarbonate compounds ==
- Sodium bicarbonate
- Potassium bicarbonate
- Caesium bicarbonate
- Magnesium bicarbonate
- Calcium bicarbonate
- Ammonium bicarbonate
- Carbonic acid

== See also ==
- Carbon dioxide
- Carbonate
- Carbonic anhydrase
- Hard water
- Arterial blood gas test
- Henderson–Hasselbalch equation
