= Carbonate =

Salt or ester of carbonic acid

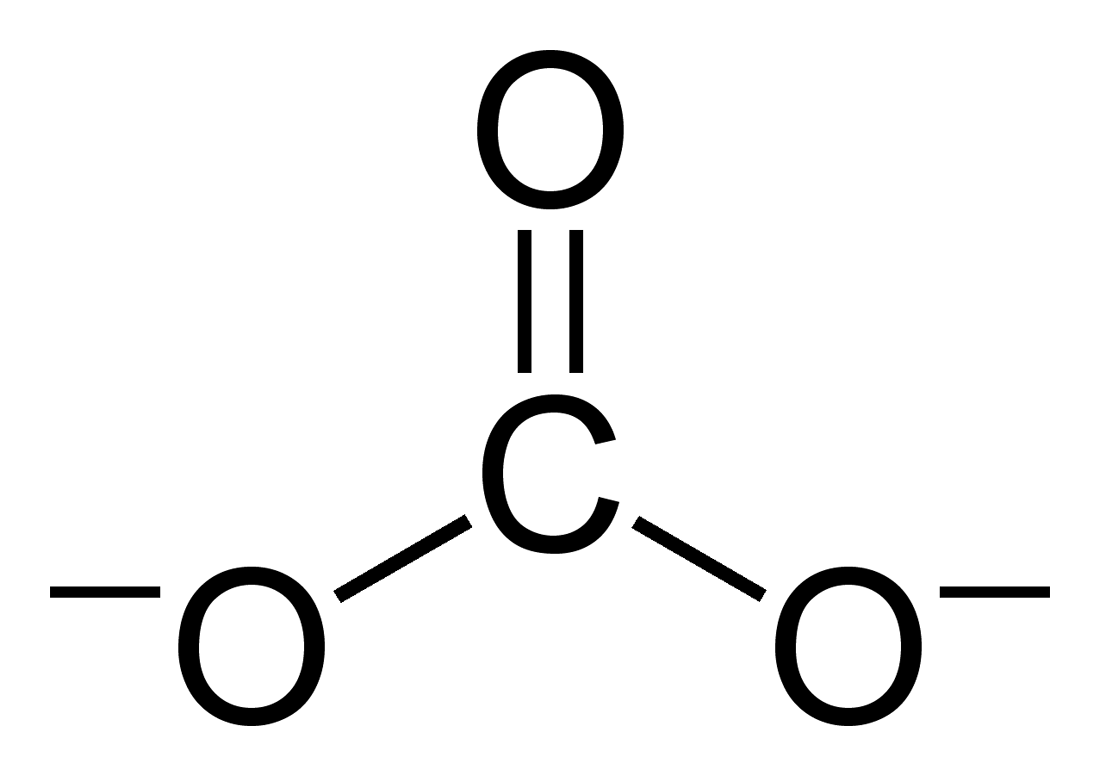
- Carbonate anion

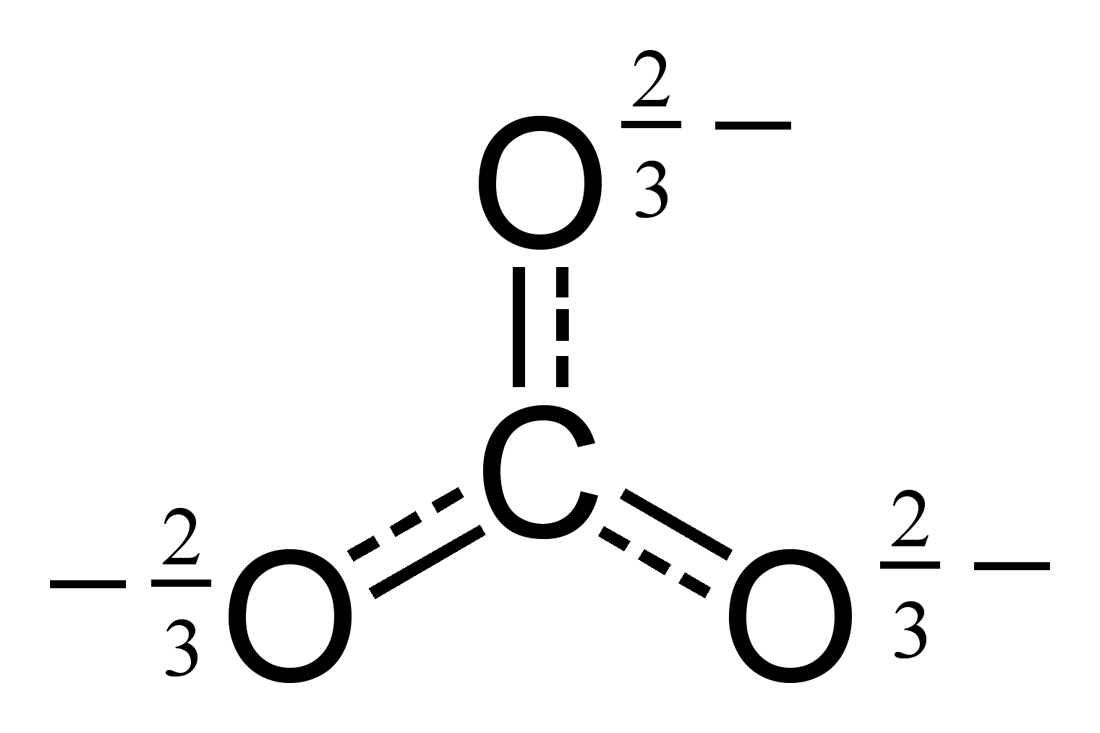
- Resonant structure of the carbonate anion

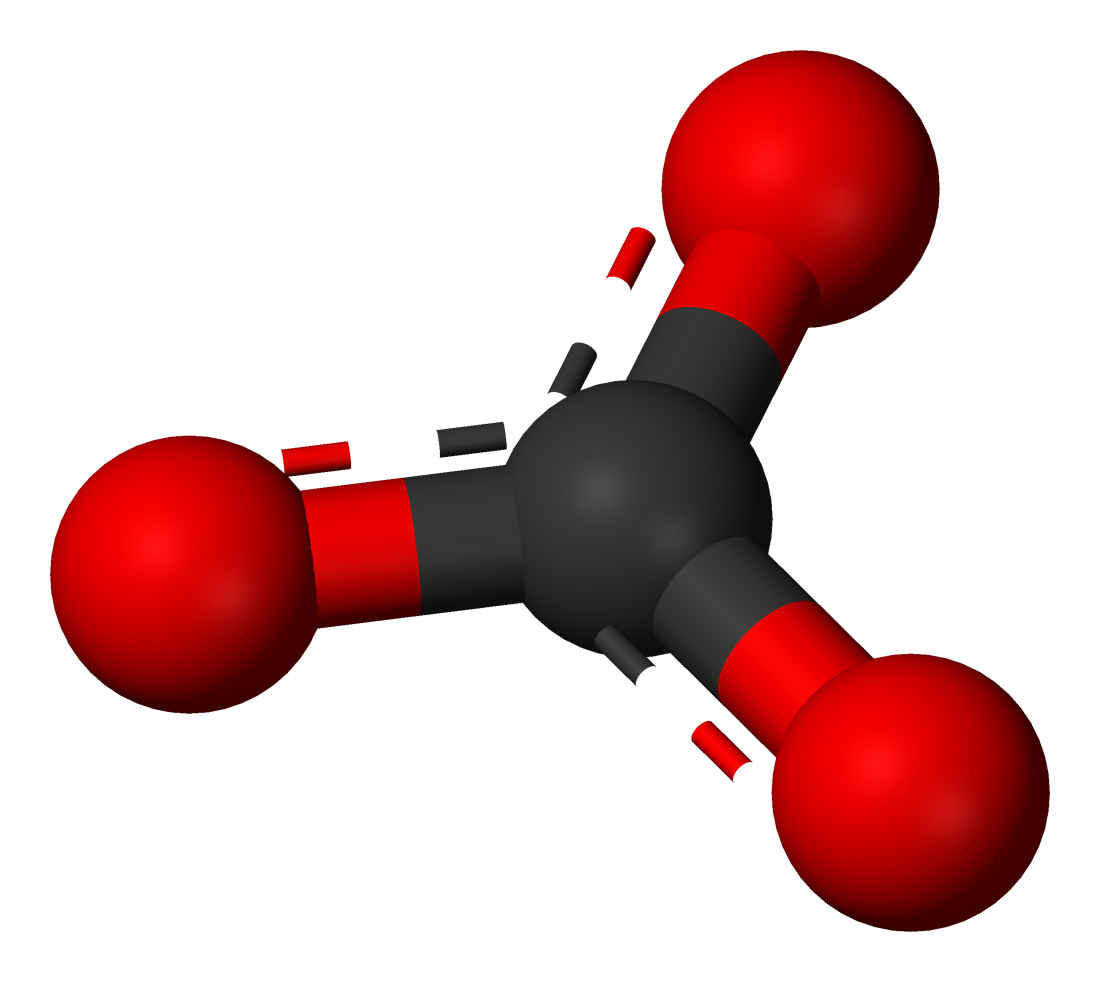
- Carbonate anion Carbon, C Oxygen, O

Names
- Preferred IUPAC name Carbonate
- Systematic IUPAC name Trioxidocarbonate

Identifiers
CAS Number	3812-32-6
3D model (JSmol)	Interactive image
ChemSpider	18519
PubChem CID	19660
UNII	7UJQ5OPE7D
- InChI: InChI=1S/CH2O3/c2-1(3)4/h(H2,2,3,4)/p-2 Key: BVKZGUZCCUSVTD-UHFFFAOYSA-L; InChI=1/CH2O3/c2-1(3)4/h(H2,2,3,4)/p-2 Key: BVKZGUZCCUSVTD-NUQVWONBAE
- SMILES: C(=O)([O-])[O-]

Properties
Chemical formula	CO_{3}^{2−}
Molar mass	60.008 g·mol^{−1}
Conjugate acid	Bicarbonate
- Except where otherwise noted, data are given for materials in their standard state (at 25 °C [77 °F], 100 kPa). Infobox references

A carbonate is a salt of carbonic acid (H_{2}CO_{3}), characterized by the presence of the carbonate ion, a polyatomic ion with the formula CO_{3}^{2−}. The word "carbonate" may also refer to a carbonate ester, an organic compound containing the carbonate group O=C(−O−)_{2}.

The term is also used as a verb, to describe carbonation: the process of raising the concentrations of carbonate and bicarbonate ions in water to produce carbonated water and other carbonated beverages – either by the addition of carbon dioxide gas under pressure or by dissolving carbonate or bicarbonate salts into the water.

In geology and mineralogy, the term "carbonate" can refer both to carbonate minerals and carbonate rock (which is made of chiefly carbonate minerals), and both are dominated by the carbonate ion, CO_{3}^{2−}. Carbonate minerals are extremely varied and ubiquitous in chemically precipitated sedimentary rock. The most common are calcite or calcium carbonate, CaCO_{3}, the chief constituent of limestone (as well as the main component of mollusc shells and coral skeletons); dolomite, a calcium-magnesium carbonate CaMg(CO_{3})_{2}; and siderite, or iron(II) carbonate, FeCO_{3}, an important iron ore. Sodium carbonate ("soda" or "natron"), Na_{2}CO_{3}, and potassium carbonate ("potash"), K_{2}CO_{3}, have been used since antiquity for cleaning and preservation, as well as for the manufacture of glass. Carbonates are widely used in industry, such as in iron smelting, as a raw material for Portland cement and lime manufacture, in the composition of ceramic glazes, and more. New applications of alkali metal carbonates include thermal energy storage and use as catalysts and electrolytes both in molten carbonate fuel cells and in electrosynthesis of H_{2}O_{2} in aqueous media.

== Structure and bonding ==
The carbonate ion is the simplest oxocarbon anion. It consists of one carbon atom surrounded by three oxygen atoms, in a trigonal planar arrangement, with D_{3h} molecular symmetry. It has a molecular mass of 60.01 g/mol and carries a total formal charge of −2. It is the conjugate base of the hydrogencarbonate (bicarbonate) ion, HCO_{3}^{−}, which is the conjugate base of H_{2}CO_{3}, carbonic acid.

The Lewis structure of the carbonate ion has two (long) single bonds to negative oxygen atoms, and one short double bond to a neutral oxygen atom.

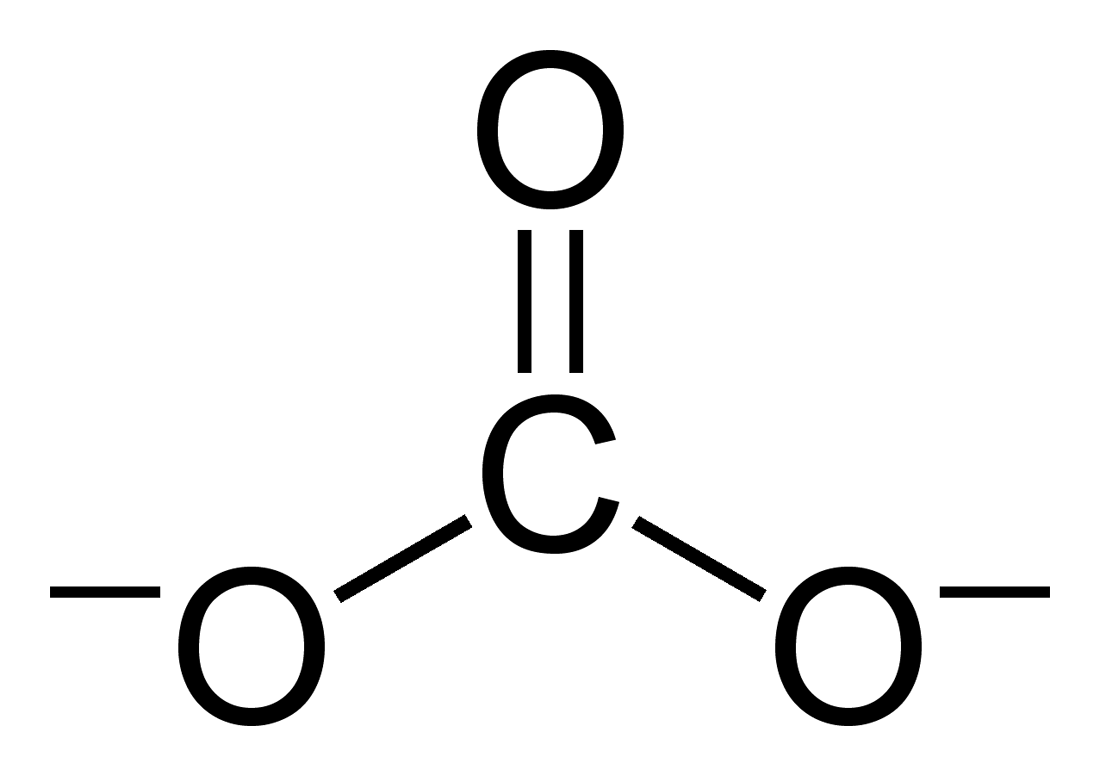

This structure is incompatible with the observed symmetry of the ion, which implies that the three bonds are the same length and that the three oxygen atoms are equivalent. As in the case of the isoelectronic nitrate ion, the symmetry can be achieved by a resonance among three structures:

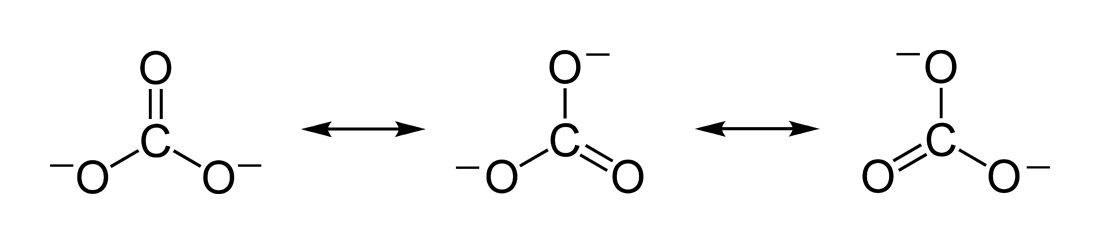

This resonance can be summarized by a model with fractional bonds and delocalized charges:

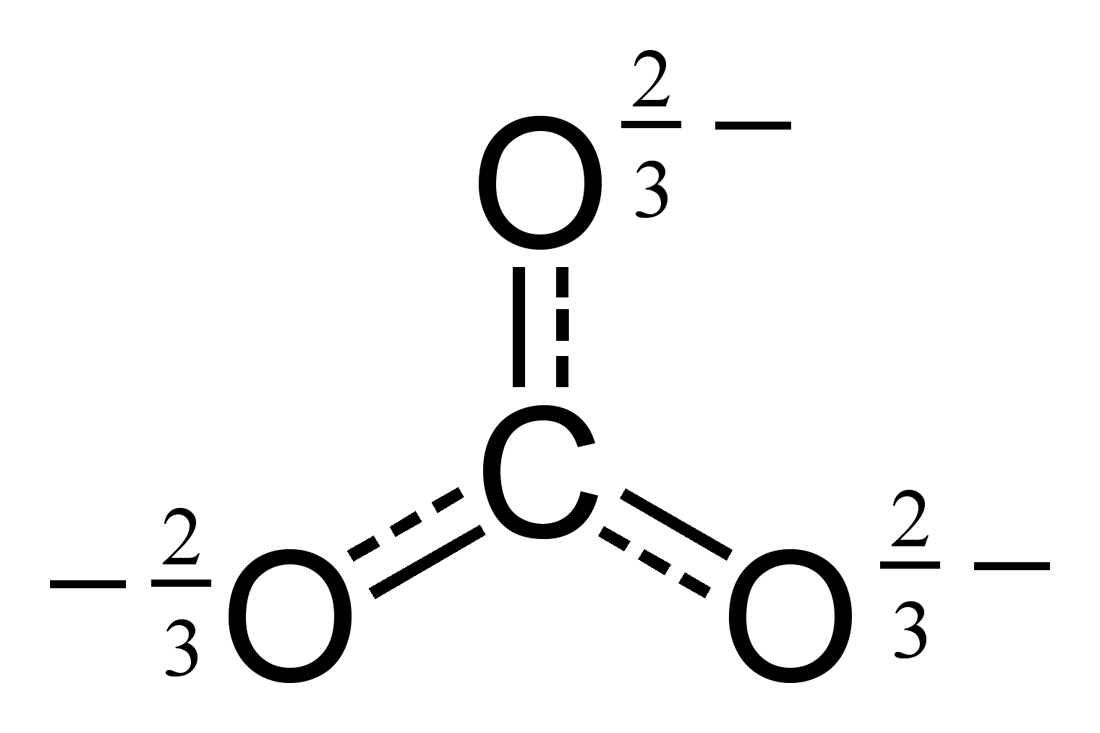
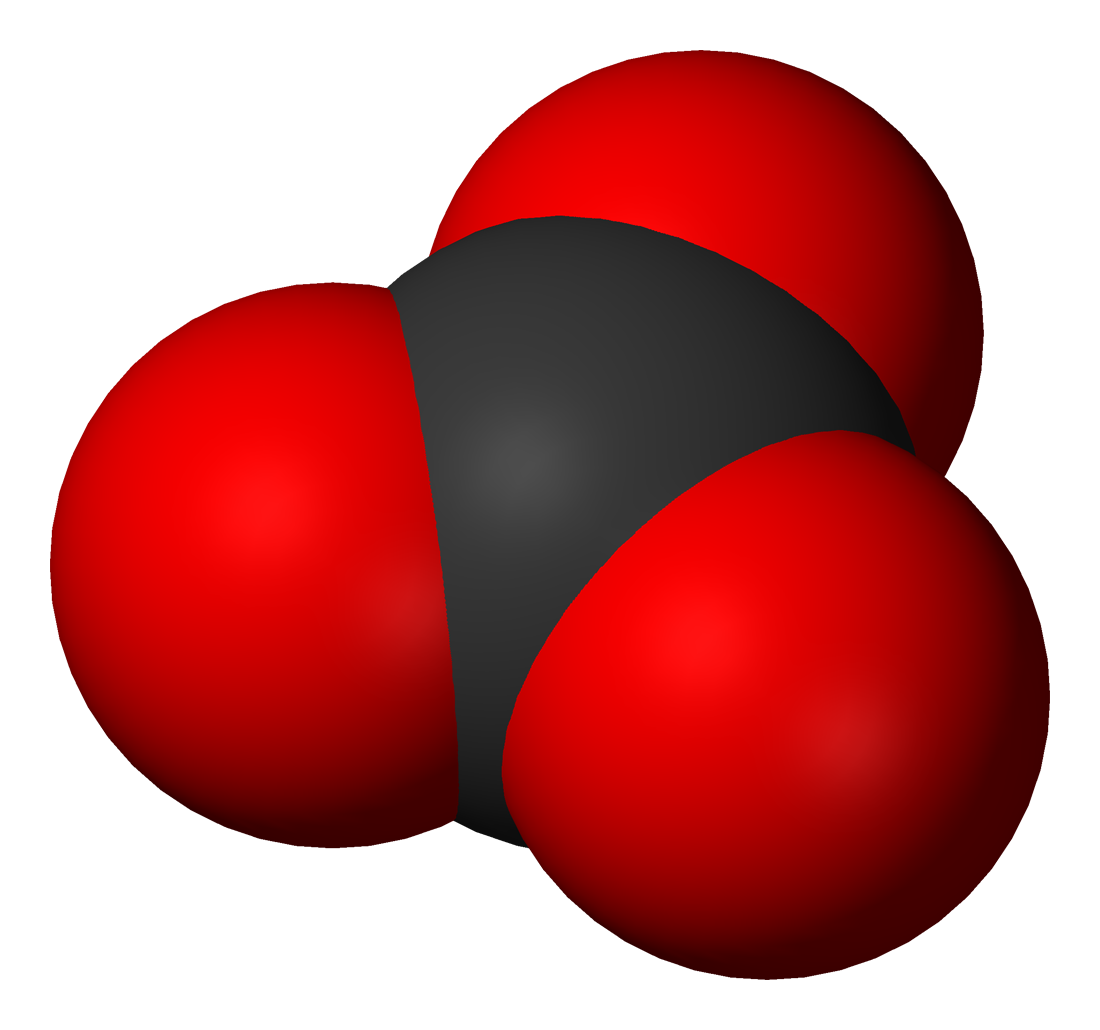

== Chemical properties ==
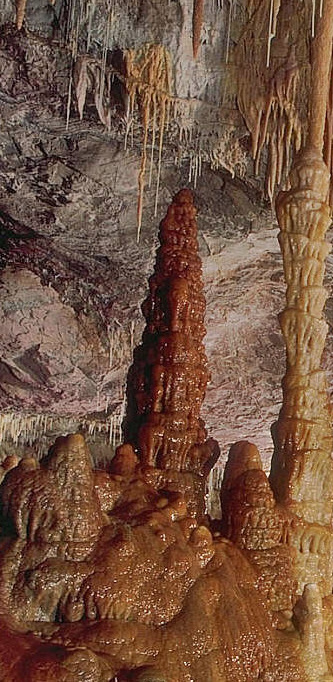
Stalactites and stalagmites are carbonate minerals.

Metal carbonates generally decompose on heating, liberating carbon dioxide and leaving behind an oxide of the metal. This process is called calcination, after calx, the Latin name of quicklime or calcium oxide, CaO, which is obtained by roasting limestone in a lime kiln:

CaCO_{3} → CaO + CO_{2}

As illustrated by its affinity for Ca^{2+}, carbonate is a ligand for many metal cations. Transition metal carbonate and bicarbonate complexes feature metal ions covalently bonded to carbonate in a variety of bonding modes.

Lithium, sodium, potassium, rubidium, caesium, and ammonium carbonates are water-soluble salts, but carbonates of 2+ and 3+ ions are often poorly soluble in water. Of the insoluble metal carbonates, CaCO_{3} is important because, in the form of scale, it accumulates in and impedes flow through pipes. Hard water is rich in this material, giving rise to the need for infrastructural water softening.

Acidification of carbonates generally liberates carbon dioxide:

CaCO_{3} + 2 HCl → CaCl_{2} + CO_{2} + H_{2}O

Thus, limescale can be removed with acid.

In aqueous solution, the dynamic equilibrium between carbonate, bicarbonate, carbon dioxide, and carbonic acid is sensitive to pH, temperature, and pressure. Although di- and trivalent carbonates have low solubility, bicarbonate salts are far more soluble. This difference is related to the disparate lattice energies of solids composed of mono- vs dianions, as well as mono- vs dications. In strongly basic conditions, the carbonate ion predominates, while in weakly basic conditions, the bicarbonate ion is prevalent. In more acid conditions, aqueous carbon dioxide, CO_{2}(aq), is the main form, which, with water, H_{2}O, is in equilibrium with carbonic acid – the equilibrium lies strongly towards carbon dioxide. Thus sodium carbonate is basic, sodium bicarbonate is weakly basic, and carbon dioxide itself is a weak acid.

== Organic carbonates ==
In organic chemistry, a carbonate can also refer to a functional group within a larger molecule that contains a carbon atom bound to three oxygen atoms, one of which is double-bonded. These compounds are also known as organocarbonates or carbonate esters, and have the general formula R−O−C(=O)−O−R′, or RR′CO_{3}. Important organocarbonates include dimethyl carbonate, the cyclic compounds ethylene carbonate and propylene carbonate, and the phosgene replacement, triphosgene.

== Buffer ==
Three reversible reactions control the pH balance of blood and act as a buffer to stabilise it in the range 7.37–7.43:

1. HCO_{3}^{−} + H^{+} ⇌ H_{2}CO_{3}
2. H_{2}CO_{3} ⇌ CO_{2}(aq) + H_{2}O
3. CO_{2}(aq) ⇌ CO_{2}(g)

Exhaled CO_{2}(g) depletes CO_{2}(aq), which in turn consumes H_{2}CO_{3}, causing the equilibrium of the first reaction to try to restore the level of carbonic acid by reacting bicarbonate with a hydrogen ion, an example of Le Châtelier's principle. The result is to make the blood more alkaline (raise pH). By the same principle, when the pH is too high, the kidneys excrete bicarbonate (HCO_{3}^{−}) into urine as urea via the urea cycle (or Krebs–Henseleit ornithine cycle). By removing the bicarbonate, more H^{+} is generated from carbonic acid (H_{2}CO_{3}), which comes from CO_{2}(g) produced by cellular respiration.

Crucially, a similar buffer operates in the oceans. It is a major factor in climate change and the long-term carbon cycle, due to the large number of marine organisms (especially coral) that are made of calcium carbonate. Increased solubility of carbonate through increased temperatures results in lower production of marine calcite and increased concentration of atmospheric carbon dioxide. This, in turn, increases Earth temperature. The amount of CO_{3}^{2−} available is on a geological scale and substantial quantities may eventually be redissolved into the sea and released to the atmosphere, increasing CO_{2} levels even more.

== Carbonate salts ==
- Carbonate overview:

== Presence outside Earth ==
It is generally thought that the presence of carbonates in rock is strong evidence for the presence of liquid water. Recent observations of the planetary nebula NGC 6302 show evidence for carbonates in space, where aqueous alteration similar to that on Earth is unlikely. Other minerals have been proposed which would fit the observations.

Small amounts of carbonate deposits have been found on Mars via spectral imaging, and Martian meteorites also contain small amounts. Groundwater may have existed at Gusev and Meridiani Planum.

== See also ==
- Cap carbonates
- Carbon trioxide
- Orthocarbonic acid, H_{4}CO_{4}, or C(OH)_{4}, a hypothetic unstable molecule
- Oxalate
- Peroxocarbonate
- Sodium percarbonate
