= Di-tert-butyl dicarbonate =

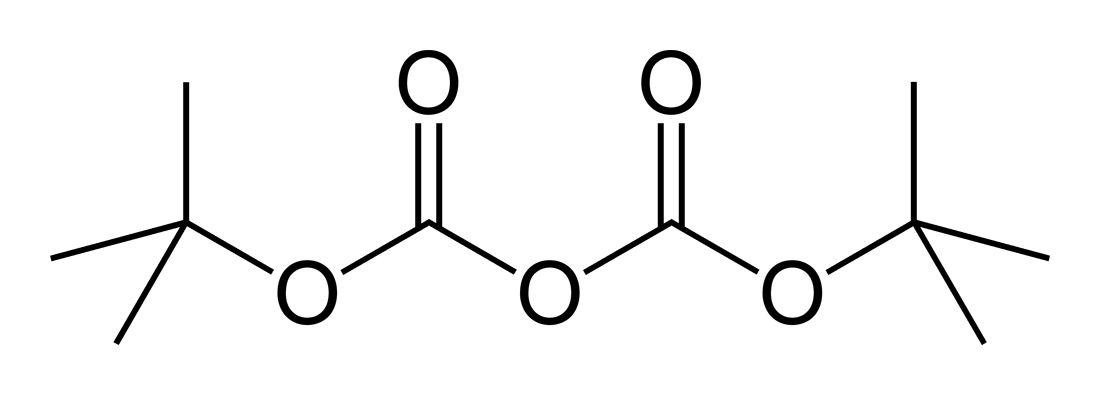

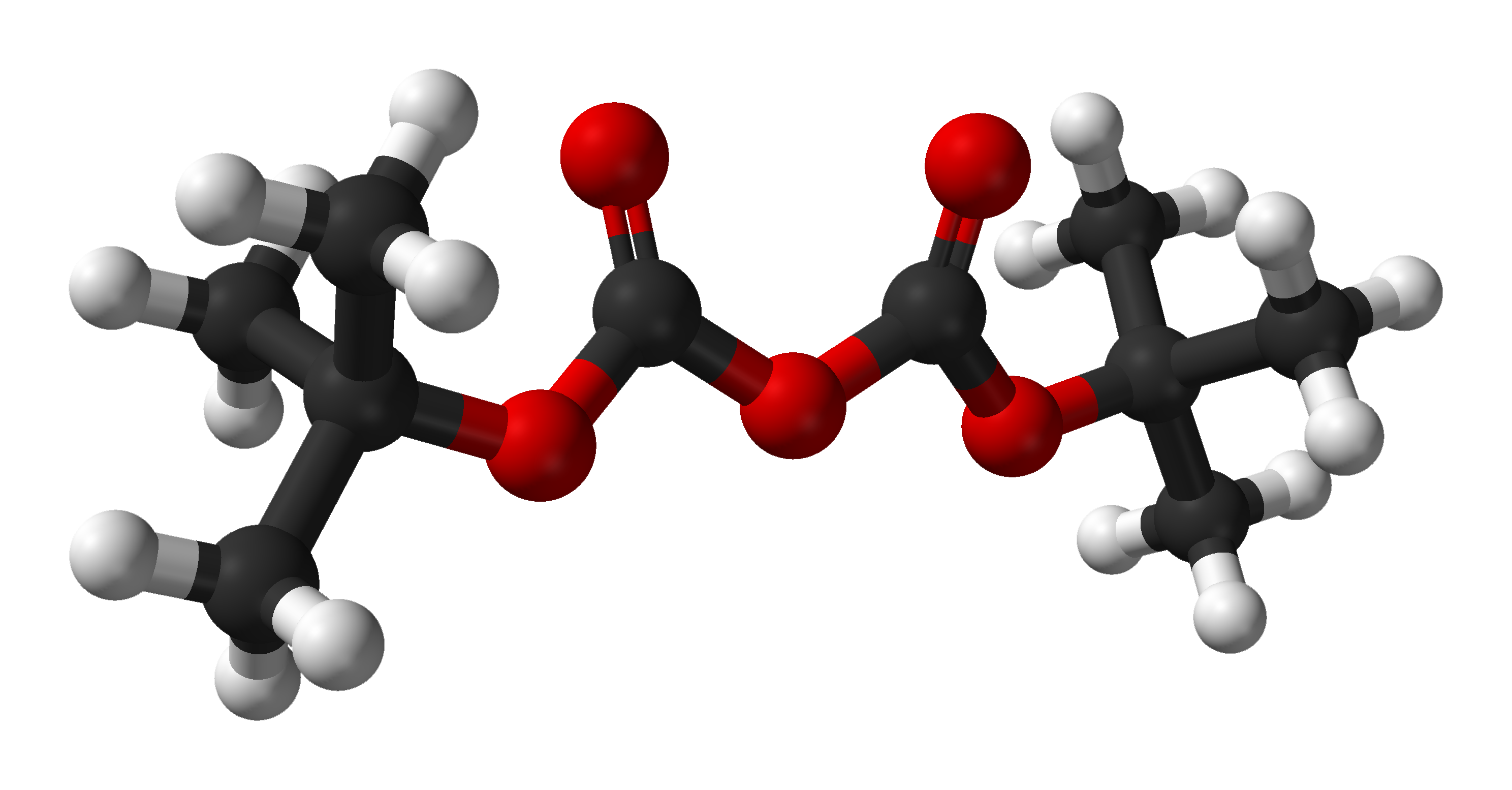

Names
- Preferred IUPAC name Di-tert-butyl dicarbonate
- Other names Di-t-butyl pyrocarbonate Boc anhydride Boc_{2}O; BocOBoc

Identifiers
| CAS Number | 24424-99-5 |
| 3D model (JSmol) | Interactive image |
| ChEBI | CHEBI:48500 |
| ChemSpider | 81704 |
| ECHA InfoCard | 100.042.021 |
| EC Number | 246-240-1 |
| PubChem CID | 90495 |
| UNII | Z10Q236C3G |
| CompTox Dashboard (EPA) | DTXSID4051904 |
- InChI: InChI=1S/C10H18O5/c1-9(2,3)14-7(11)13-8(12)15-10(4,5)6/h1-6H3 Key: DYHSDKLCOJIUFX-UHFFFAOYSA-N; InChI=1/C10H18O5/c1-9(2,3)14-7(11)13-8(12)15-10(4,5)6/h1-6H3 Key: DYHSDKLCOJIUFX-UHFFFAOYAG
- SMILES: O=C(OC(=O)OC(C)(C)C)OC(C)(C)C

Properties
| Chemical formula | C_{10}H_{18}O_{5} |
| Molar mass | 218.249 g·mol^{−1} |
| Appearance | Colorless solid or oil |
| Density | 0.95 g·cm^{−3} |
| Melting point | 22 to 24 °C (72 to 75 °F; 295 to 297 K) |
| Boiling point | 56 to 57 °C (133 to 135 °F; 329 to 330 K) (0.5 mmHg) |
| Solubility in water | insoluble |
| Solubility in other solvents | Soluble in most organic solvents |

Hazards
- Occupational safety and health (OHS/OSH)
| Main hazards | Very toxic on inhalation T+, LC_{50} = 100 mg/m^{3} (4 hr, rat) |

Related compounds
| Related compounds | Ethyl chloroformate Phosgene; Diethyl pyrocarbonate Dimethyl dicarbonate |
- Except where otherwise noted, data are given for materials in their standard state (at 25 °C [77 °F], 100 kPa). verify (what is ?) Infobox references

Di-tert-butyl dicarbonate is a reagent widely used in organic synthesis. Since this compound can be regarded formally as the acid anhydride derived from a tert-butoxycarbonyl (Boc) group, it is commonly referred to as Boc anhydride. This pyrocarbonate reacts with amines to give N-tert-butoxycarbonyl or so-called Boc derivatives. These carbamate derivatives do not behave as amines, which allows certain subsequent transformations to occur that would be incompatible with the amine functional group. The Boc group can later be removed from the amine using moderately strong acids (e.g., trifluoroacetic acid). Thus, Boc serves as a protective group, for instance in solid phase peptide synthesis. Boc-protected amines are unreactive to most bases and nucleophiles, allowing for the use of the fluorenylmethyloxycarbonyl group (Fmoc) as an orthogonal protecting group.

== Preparation ==
Di-tert-butyl dicarbonate is inexpensive, so it is usually purchased. Classically, this compound is prepared from tert-butanol, carbon dioxide, and phosgene, using DABCO as a base:

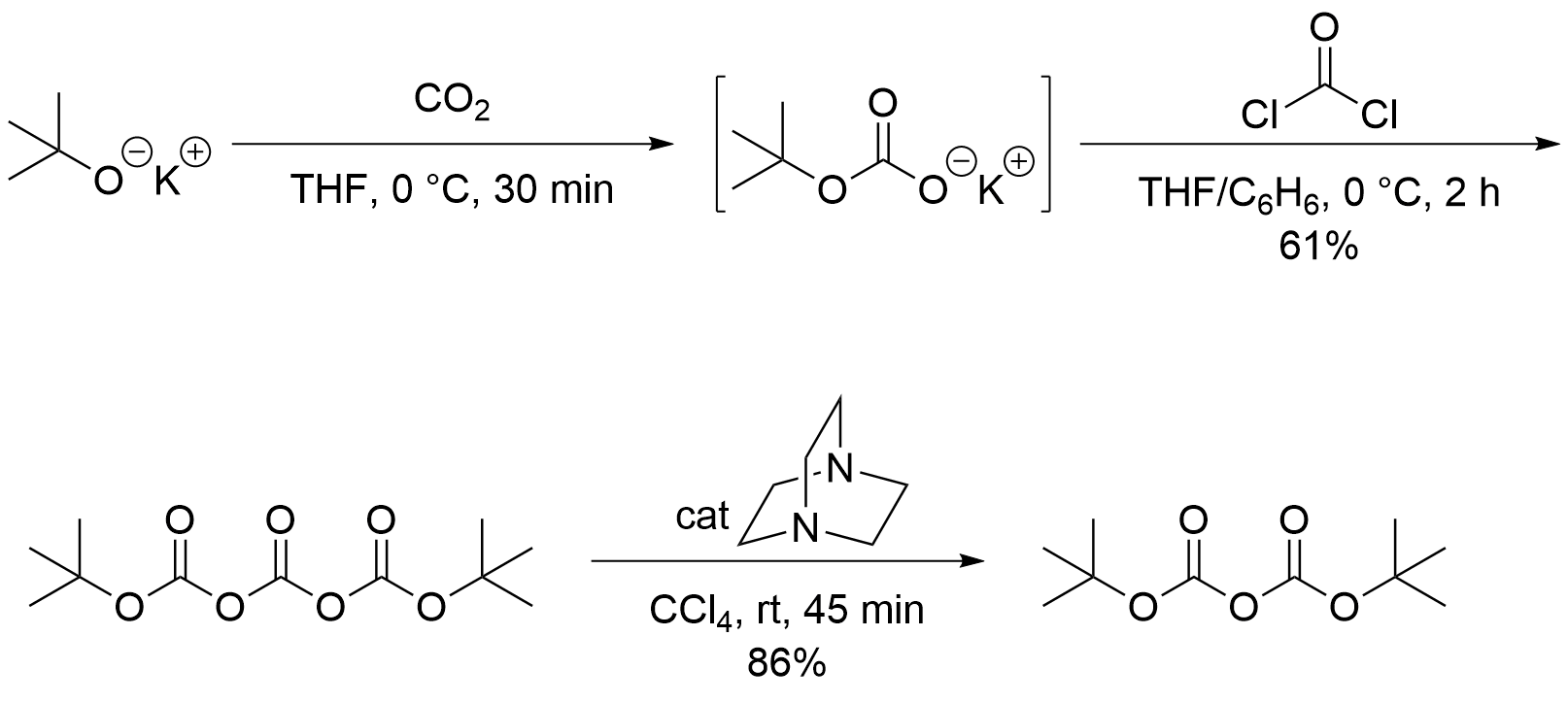

This route is currently employed commercially by manufacturers in China and India. European and Japanese companies use the reaction of sodium tert-butoxide with carbon dioxide, catalysed by p-toluenesulfonic acid or methanesulfonic acid. This process involves a distillation of the crude material yielding a very pure grade.

Boc anhydride is also available as a 70% solution in toluene or THF. As boc anhydride may melt at ambient temperatures, its storage and handling is sometimes simplified by using a solution.

== Protection and deprotection of amines ==
The Boc group can be added to the amine under aqueous conditions using di-tert-butyl dicarbonate in the presence of a base such as sodium bicarbonate. Protection of the amine can also be accomplished in acetonitrile solution using 4-dimethylaminopyridine (DMAP) as the base.

Removal of the Boc in amino acids can be accomplished with strong acids such as trifluoroacetic acid neat or in dichloromethane or with HCl in methanol. A complication may be the tendency of the t-butyl cation intermediate to alkylate other nucleophiles; scavengers such as anisole or thioanisole may be used. Selective cleavage of the N-Boc group in the presence of other protecting groups is possible when using AlCl_{3}.

Reaction with trimethylsilyl iodide in acetonitrile followed by methanol is a mild and versatile method of deprotecting Boc-protected amines.

The use of triethylsilane as a carbocation scavenger in the presence of trifluoroacetic acid in dichloromethane has been shown to lead to increased yields, decreased reaction times, simple work-up and improved selectivity for the deprotection of t-butyl ester and t-butoxycarbonyl sites in protected amino-acids and peptides in the presence of other acid-sensitive protecting groups such as the benzyloxycarbonyl, 9-fluorenylmethoxycarbonyl, O- and S-benzyl and t-butylthio groups.

== Other uses ==
The synthesis of 6-acetyl-1,2,3,4-tetrahydropyridine, an important bread aroma compound, starting from 2-piperidone was accomplished using t-boc anhydride. (See Maillard reaction). The first step in this reaction sequence is the formation of the carbamate from the reaction of the amide nitrogen with boc anhydride in acetonitrile using DMAP as a catalyst.

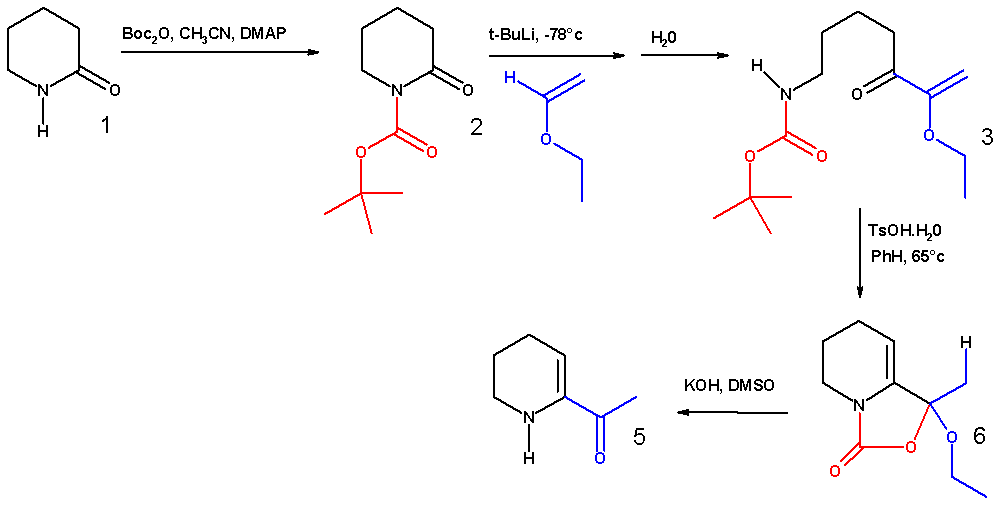

Di-tert-butyl dicarbonate also finds applications as a polymer blowing agent due to its decomposition into gaseous products upon heating.

== Hazards ==
Bottles of di-tert-butyl dicarbonate buildup of internal pressure in sealed containers caused by its slow decomposition to di-tert-butyl carbonate and ultimately tert-butanol and CO_{2} in the presence of moisture. For this reason, it is usually sold and stored in plastic bottles rather than glass ones.

The main hazard of the reagent is its inhalational toxicity. Its median lethal concentration of 100 mg/m^{3} over 4 hours in rats is comparable to that of phosgene (49 mg/m^{3} over 50 min in rats).
