= Oxalate =

Any derivative of oxalic acid; chemical compound containing oxalate moiety

- The structure of the oxalate anion

Names
- IUPAC name Oxalate
- Systematic IUPAC name Ethanedioate

Identifiers
CAS Number	338-70-5
3D model (JSmol)	Interactive image
Beilstein Reference	1905970
ChEBI	CHEBI:30623
ChemSpider	64235
Gmelin Reference	2207
KEGG	C00209
PubChem CID	71081
UNII	PQ7QG47K6T
- InChI: InChI=1S/C2H2O4/c3-1(4)2(5)6/h(H,3,4)(H,5,6)/p-2 Key: MUBZPKHOEPUJKR-UHFFFAOYSA-L; InChI=1S/C2H2O4/c3-1(4)2(5)6/h(H,3,4)(H,5,6)/p-2 Key: MUBZPKHOEPUJKR-UHFFFAOYSA-L
- SMILES: C(=O)(C(=O)[O-])[O-]

Properties
Chemical formula	C_{2}O_{4}^{2−}
Molar mass	88.018 g·mol^{−1}
Conjugate acid	Hydrogenoxalate

Structure
Point group	D_{2h}

Related compounds
Related isoelectronic	Dinitrogen tetroxide
- Except where otherwise noted, data are given for materials in their standard state (at 25 °C [77 °F], 100 kPa). Infobox references

Oxalate (systematic IUPAC name: ethanedioate) is an anion with the chemical formula C_{2}O_{4}^{2−}. This dianion is colorless. It occurs naturally, including in some foods. It forms a variety of salts, for example sodium oxalate (Na_{2}C_{2}O_{4}), and several esters such as dimethyl oxalate ((CH_{3})_{2}C_{2}O_{4}). It is a conjugate base of oxalic acid. At neutral pH in aqueous solution, oxalic acid converts completely to oxalate.

== Relationship to oxalic acid ==
The dissociation of protons from oxalic acid proceeds in a determined order; as for other polyprotic acids, loss of a single proton results in the monovalent hydrogenoxalate anion HC_{2}O_{4}^{−}. A salt with this anion is sometimes called an acid oxalate, monobasic oxalate, or hydrogen oxalate. The equilibrium constant (K_{a}) for loss of the first proton is 5.37×10^{−2} (pK_{a} = 1.27). The loss of the second proton, which yields the oxalate ion, has an equilibrium constant of 5.25×10^{−5} (pK_{a} = 4.28). These values imply, in solutions with neutral pH, no oxalic acid and only trace amounts of hydrogen oxalate exist. The literature is often unclear on the distinction between H_{2}C_{2}O_{4}, HC_{2}O_{4}^{−}, and C_{2}O_{4}^{2−}, and the collection of species is referred to as oxalic acid.

== Structure ==
The oxalate anion exists in a nonplanar conformation where the O–C–C–O dihedrals approach 90° with approximate D_{2d} symmetry. When chelated to cations, oxalate adopts the planar, D_{2h} conformation. However, in the structure of caesium oxalate Cs_{2}C_{2}O_{4} the O–C–C–O dihedral angle is 81(1)°. Therefore, Cs_{2}C_{2}O_{4} is more closely approximated by a D_{2d} symmetry structure because the two CO_{2} planes are staggered. Two structural forms of rubidium oxalate Rb_{2}C_{2}O_{4} have been identified by single-crystal X-ray diffraction: one contains a planar and the other a staggered oxalate.

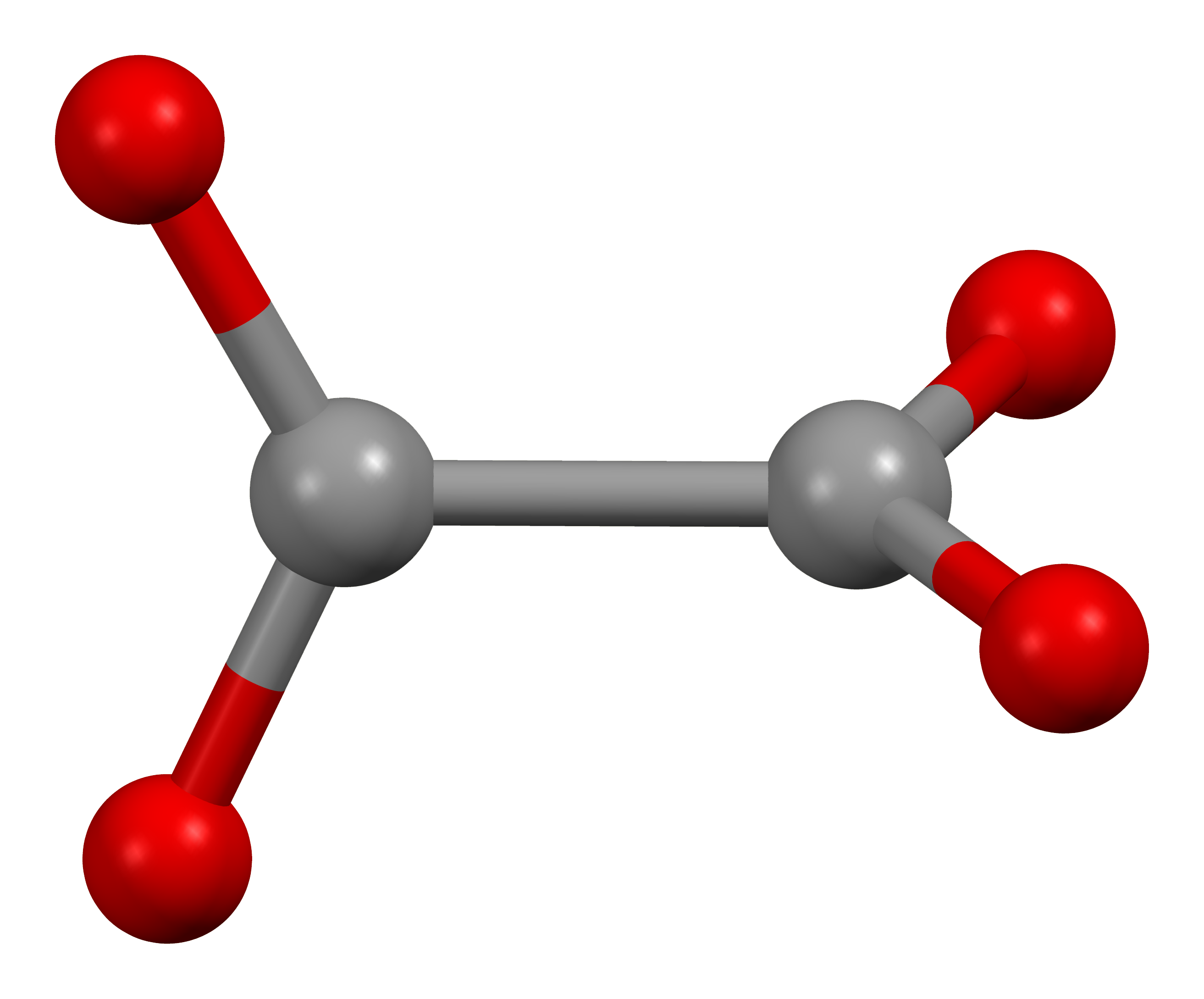
Nonplanar conformation found in caesium oxalate Cs_{2}C_{2}O_{4}

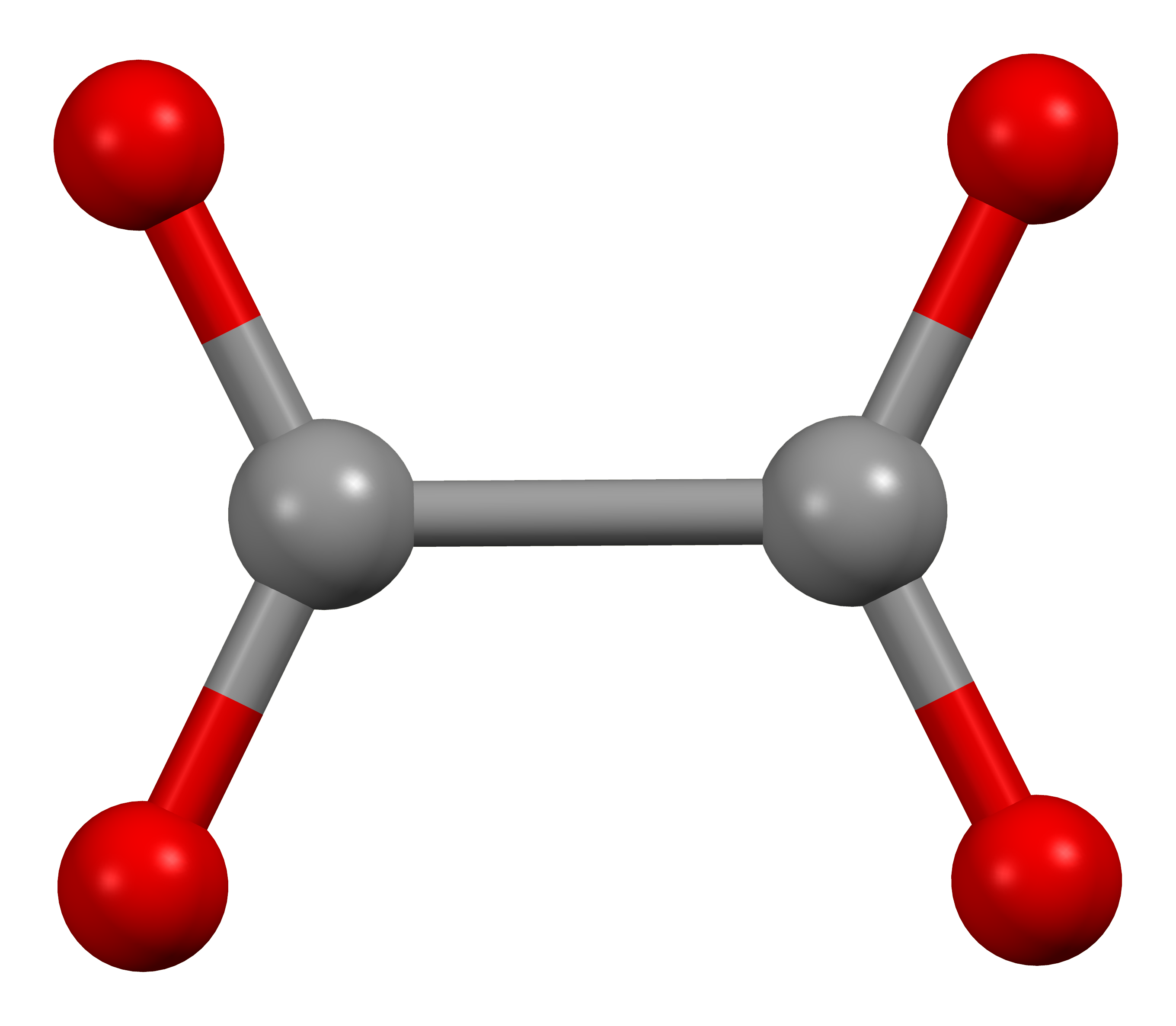
Planar conformation found in potassium oxalate K_{2}C_{2}O_{4}

The barrier to rotation about this bond is calculated to be roughly 2–6 kcal (8.4–25.1 kJ) mol^{-1} for the free dianion, C_{2}O_{4}^{2−}. Such results are consistent with the interpretation that the central C−C bond is regarded as a single bond with minimal π interactions between the two CO_{2}^{−} units. This barrier to rotation about the C−C bond (which formally corresponds to the difference in energy between the planar and staggered forms) may be attributed to electrostatic interactions as unfavorable O−O repulsion is maximized in the planar form.

== Occurrence in nature ==
Oxalate occurs in many plants, where it is synthesized by the incomplete oxidation of saccharides. Calcium oxalate crystals known as raphides are also used by plants as a defense mechanism.

Several plant foods such as the root and/or leaves of spinach, rhubarb, and buckwheat are high in oxalic acid and can contribute to the formation of kidney stones in some individuals. Other oxalate-rich plants include fat hen ("lamb's quarters"), sorrel, and several Oxalis species (also sometimes called sorrels). Other edible plants with significant concentrations of oxalate include, in decreasing order, star fruit (carambola), black pepper, parsley, poppy seed, amaranth, chard, beets, cocoa and chocolate, most nuts, most berries, fishtail palms, New Zealand spinach (Tetragonia tetragonioides), and beans. Leaves of the tea plant (Camellia sinensis) contain among the greatest measured concentrations of oxalic acid relative to other plants. However, the drink derived by infusion in hot water typically contains only low to moderate amounts of oxalic acid due to the small mass of leaves used for brewing. Some fungi of the genus Aspergillus also produce oxalic acid.

Common high-oxalate foods
Food item	Serving	Oxalate content (mg)
Beetroot greens, cooked	1/2 cup	916
Purslane, leaves, cooked	1/2 cup	910
Rhubarb, stewed, no sugar	1/2 cup	860
Spinach, cooked	1/2 cup	750
Beet, cooked	1/2 cup	675
Chard, Swiss, leaves cooked	1/2 cup	660
Rhubarb, canned	1/2 cup	600
Spinach, frozen	1/2 cup	600
Beet, pickled	1/2 cup	500
Poke greens, cooked	1/2 cup	476
Almond, raw	1 oz	296
Endive, raw	20 long leaves	273
Cocoa, dry	1/3 cup	254
Dandelion greens, cooked	1/2 cup	246
Okra, cooked	8–9 pods	146
Sweet potato, cooked	1/2 cup	141
Kale, cooked	1/2 cup	125
Peanuts, raw	1/3 cup (1 3/4 oz)	113
Turnip greens, cooked	1/2 cup	110
Chocolate, unsweetened	1 oz	91
Parsnips, diced, cooked	1/2 cup	81
Collard greens, cooked	1/2 cup	74
Pecans, halves, raw	1/3 cup (1 1/4 oz)	74
Tea, leaves (4-minute infusion)	1 level tsp in 7 fl oz water	72
Cereal germ, toasted	1/4 cup	67
Gooseberries	1/2 cup	66
Potato, Idaho white, baked	1 medium	64
Carrots, cooked	1/2 cup	45
Apple, raw with skin	1 medium	41
Brussels sprouts, cooked	6–8 medium	37
Strawberries, raw	1/2 cup	35
Celery, raw	2 stalks	34
Milk chocolate bar	1 bar (1.02 oz)	34
Raspberries, black, raw	1/2 cup	33
Orange, edible portion	1 medium	24
Green beans, cooked	1/2 cup	23
Chives, raw, chopped	1 tablespoon	19
Leeks, raw	1/2 medium	15
Blackberries, raw	1/2 cup	13
Concord grapes	1/2 cup	13
Blueberries, raw	1/2 cup	11
Redcurrants	1/2 cup	11
Apricots, raw	2 medium	10
Raspberries, red, raw	1/2 cup	10
Broccoli, cooked	1 large stalk	6
Cranberry juice	1/2 cup (4 oz)	6

=== Physiological effects ===
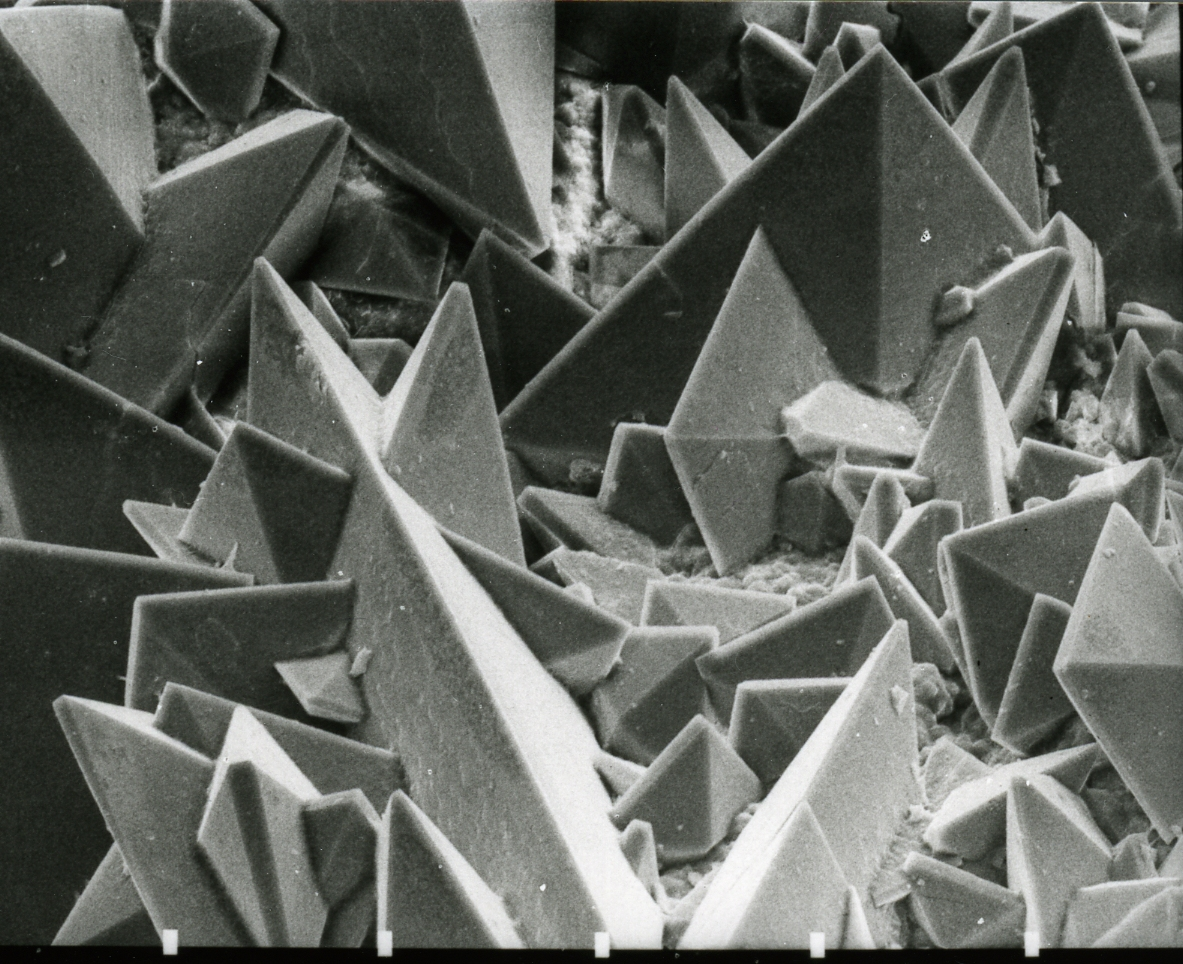
Scanning electron micrograph of the surface of a kidney stone showing tetragonal crystals of weddellite (calcium oxalate dihydrate) emerging from the amorphous central part of the stone; the horizontal length of the picture represents 0.5 mm of the figured original.

Excess consumption of oxalate-rich foods has been linked to formation of salts such as calcium oxalate, a risk factor for kidney stones.

== As a ligand for metal ions ==
Oxalate also forms coordination compounds where it is sometimes abbreviated as ox. It is commonly encountered as a bidentate ligand. When the oxalate chelates to a single metal center, it always adopts the planar conformation. As a bidentate ligand, it forms a 5-membered MC_{2}O_{2} ring. An illustrative complex is potassium ferrioxalate, K_{3}[Fe(C_{2}O_{4})_{3}]. The drug oxaliplatin exhibits improved water solubility relative to older platinum-based drugs, avoiding the dose-limiting side-effect of nephrotoxicity. Oxalic acid and oxalates can be oxidized by permanganate in an autocatalytic reaction. One of the main applications of oxalic acid is rust-removal, which arises because oxalate forms water-soluble derivatives with the ferric ion.

== Excess ==
An excess oxalate level in the blood is termed hyperoxalemia, and high levels of oxalate in the urine is termed hyperoxaluria.

=== Acquired ===
Although unusual, consumption of oxalates (for example, the grazing of animals on oxalate-containing plants such as Bassia hyssopifolia, or human consumption of wood sorrel or, specifically in excessive quantities, black tea) may result in kidney disease or even death due to oxalate poisoning. The New England Journal of Medicine reported acute oxalate nephropathy "almost certainly due to excessive consumption of iced tea" in a 56-year-old man, who drank "sixteen 8-ounce glasses of iced tea daily" (roughly one gallon or 3.8 liters). The authors of the paper hypothesized that acute oxalate nephropathy is an underdiagnosed cause of kidney failure and suggested thorough examination of patient dietary history in cases of unexplained kidney failure without proteinuria (an excess of protein in the urine) and with large amounts of calcium oxalate in urine sediment. Oxalobacter formigenes in the gut flora may help alleviate this.

=== Congenital ===
Primary hyperoxaluria is a rare, inherited condition, resulting in increased excretion of oxalate, with oxalate stones being common.
