= Dipropyl peroxydicarbonate =

Names
- Preferred IUPAC name Dipropyl 2-peroxydicarbonate
- Other names: n-Propyl percarbonate; Di-n-propyl peroxydicarbonate; Di(n-propyl)peroxydicarbonate; Peroxydicarbonic acid, dipropyl ester; Luperox 221

Identifiers
CAS Number	16066-38-9
3D model (JSmol)	Interactive image
ChemSpider	76895
ECHA InfoCard	100.036.540
EC Number	240-211-7
PubChem CID	85264
UNII	52N9W6F4YM
UN number	3113
CompTox Dashboard (EPA)	DTXSID2051762
- InChI: InChI=1S/C8H14O6/c1-3-5-11-7(9)13-14-8(10)12-6-4-2/h3-6H2,1-2H3 Key: YPVDWEHVCUBACK-UHFFFAOYSA-N
- SMILES: CCCOC(=O)OOC(=O)OCCC

Properties
Chemical formula	C_{8}H_{14}O_{6}
Molar mass	206.194 g·mol^{−1}

Hazards
- GHS labelling
Pictograms	(GHS02: Flammable) (GHS07: Exclamation mark)
Signal word	Warning
Hazard statements	H242, H315, H319
Precautionary statements	P210, P220, P234, P264, P280, P302+P352, P305+P351+P338, P321, P332+P313, P337+P313, P362, P370+P378, P403+P235, P411, P420, P501
- Except where otherwise noted, data are given for materials in their standard state (at 25 °C [77 °F], 100 kPa). Infobox references

Dipropyl peroxydicarbonate (trade name Luperox 221) is an organic peroxide with a variety of industrial uses, particularly as an initiator of polymerization.

Dipropyl peroxydicarbonate decomposes explosively at 0–10 °C (32–50 °F) due to a self-accelerating exothermic decomposition.
