= Rubidium carbonate =

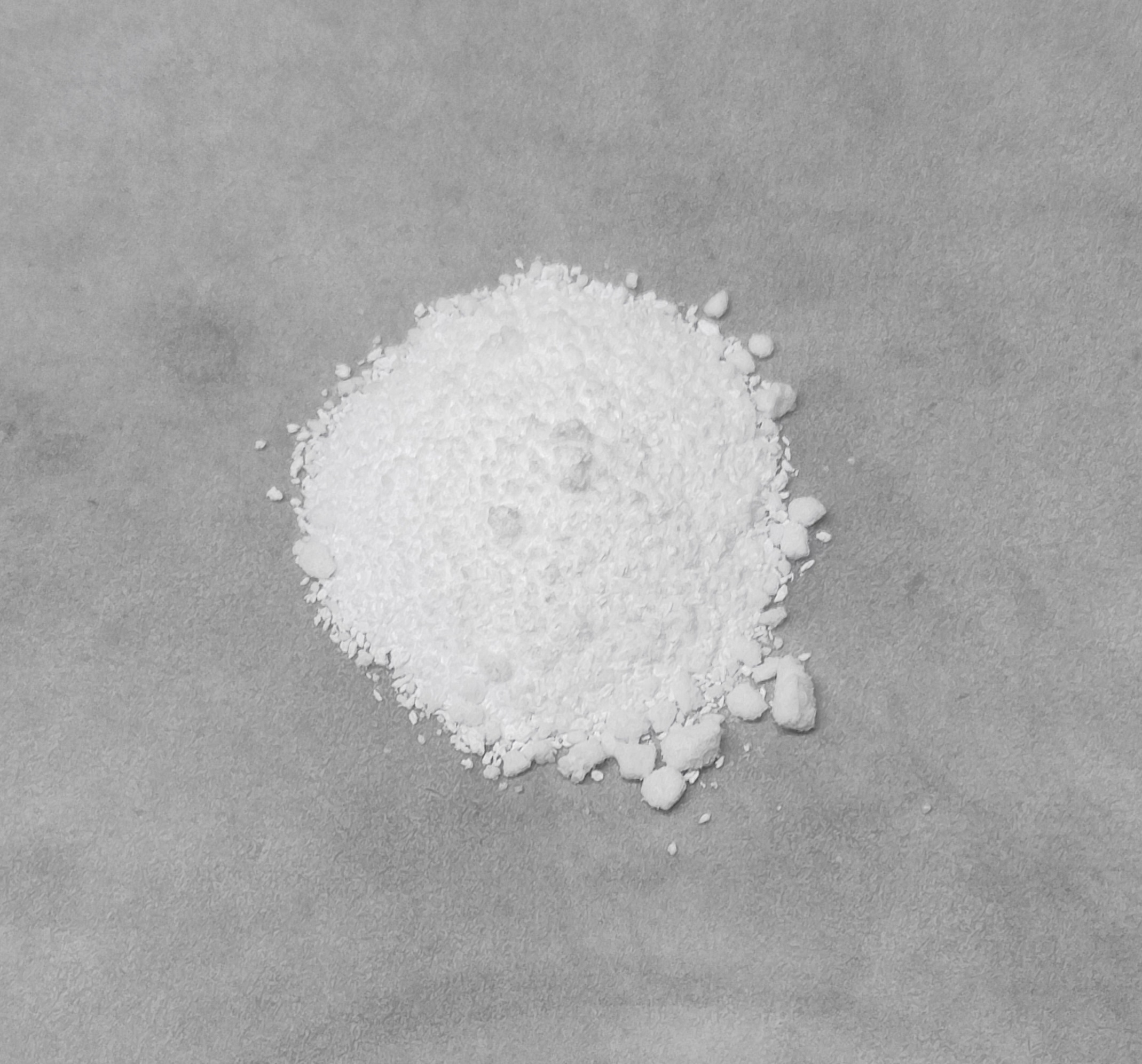

Names
- IUPAC name Rubidium carbonate

Identifiers
CAS Number	584-09-8
3D model (JSmol)	Interactive image
ChemSpider	10950
ECHA InfoCard	100.008.666
PubChem CID	11431
RTECS number	FG0650000
UNII	57K2A28LPS
CompTox Dashboard (EPA)	DTXSID50889428
- InChI: InChI=1S/CH2O3.2Rb/c2-1(3)4;;/h(H2,2,3,4);;/q;2*+1/p-2 Key: WPFGFHJALYCVMO-UHFFFAOYSA-L; InChI=1/CH2O3.2Rb/c2-1(3)4;;/h(H2,2,3,4);;/q;2*+1/p-2 Key: WPFGFHJALYCVMO-NUQVWONBAM
- SMILES: [Rb+].[Rb+].[O-]C([O-])=O

Properties
Chemical formula	Rb_{2}CO_{3}
Molar mass	230.945 g/mol
Appearance	White powder, very hygroscopic
Melting point	837 °C (1,539 °F; 1,110 K)
Boiling point	900 °C (1,650 °F; 1,170 K) (decomposes)
Solubility in water	4500 g/L @20°C
Magnetic susceptibility (χ)	−75.4·10^{−6} cm^{3}/mol

Hazards
- Occupational safety and health (OHS/OSH)
Main hazards	Irritant
- GHS labelling
Pictograms	(GHS07: Exclamation mark)
Signal word	Warning
Hazard statements	H315, H319, H335
Precautionary statements	P261, P264, P264+P265, P271, P280, P302+P352, P304+P340, P305+P351+P338, P319, P321, P332+P317, P337+P317, P362+P364, P403+P233, P405, P501
Flash point	Non-flammable

Related compounds
Other cations	Lithium carbonate Sodium carbonate Potassium carbonate Caesium carbonate
- Except where otherwise noted, data are given for materials in their standard state (at 25 °C [77 °F], 100 kPa). verify (what is ?) Infobox references

Rubidium carbonate is an inorganic compound with the chemical formula Rb_{2}CO_{3}. It is a white, hygroscopic solid that readily dissolves in water.

== Preparation ==
Rubidium carbonate can be prepared by reacting ammonium carbonate and rubidium hydroxide.

== Uses ==
It is used in glassmaking to enhance stability and durability whilst reducing conductivity.

It is also used as a part of a catalyst to prepare short-chain alcohols from feed gas.
