= Dysprosium(III) oxalate =

Chemical compound Dy2(C2O4)3

Names
- IUPAC name Dysprosium(III) oxalate
- Other names: Didysprosium trioxalate; Dysprosium sesquioxalate

Identifiers
CAS Number	867-62-9 (anhydrous); decahydrate: 24670-07-3
3D model (JSmol)	Interactive image; decahydrate: Interactive image
ChemSpider	144420; decahydrate: 21241430
ECHA InfoCard	100.011.604
EC Number	212-763-9; decahydrate: 677-838-4
PubChem CID	164743; decahydrate: 25021601
CompTox Dashboard (EPA)	DTXSID801007033; decahydrate: DTXSID00648461
- InChI: InChI=1S/3C2H2O4.2Dy/c3*3-1(4)2(5)6;;/h3*(H,3,4)(H,5,6);;/q;;;2*+3/p-6 Key: KACTUDRDWYCYMT-UHFFFAOYSA-H; decahydrate: InChI=1S/3C2H2O4.2Dy.10H2O/c3*3-1(4)2(5)6;;;;;;;;;;;;/h3*(H,3,4)(H,5,6);;;10*1H2/q;;;2*+3;;;;;;;;;;/p-6 Key: ULOOLRKTTNPQEM-UHFFFAOYSA-H
- SMILES: C(=O)(C(=O)[O-])[O-].C(=O)(C(=O)[O-])[O-].C(=O)(C(=O)[O-])[O-].[Dy+3].[Dy+3]; decahydrate: C(=O)(C(=O)[O-])[O-].C(=O)(C(=O)[O-])[O-].C(=O)(C(=O)[O-])[O-].O.O.O.O.O.O.O.O.O.O.[Dy+3].[Dy+3]

Properties
Chemical formula	Dy_{2}(C_{2}O_{4})_{3}
Molar mass	589.06 g/mol
Appearance	white powder
Melting point	40 °C (104 °F; 313 K) (decahydrate)

Hazards
- GHS labelling
Pictograms	(GHS07: Exclamation mark)
Signal word	Warning
Hazard statements	H302, H312
Precautionary statements	P264, P270, P280, P301+P317, P302+P352, P317, P321, P330, P362+P364, P501

Related compounds
Other cations	Cerium(III) oxalate; Europium(III) oxalate; Gadolinium(III) oxalate; Holmium(III) oxalate; Lanthanum(III) oxalate; Neodymium(III) oxalate; Praseodymium(III) oxalate; Promethium(III) oxalate; Samarium(III) oxalate; Terbium(III) oxalate; Thulium(III) oxalate; Ytterbium(III) oxalate
- Except where otherwise noted, data are given for materials in their standard state (at 25 °C [77 °F], 100 kPa). Infobox references

Dysprosium(III) oxalate is an inorganic compound with the chemical formula Dy_{2}(C_{2}O_{4})_{3}. It forms hydrates, with the decahydrate Dy_{2}(C_{2}O_{4})_{3}·10H_{2}O being commonly encountered. The anhydrous form is amorphous and unstable, decomposing to dysprosium(III) oxide at 610°C. It is insoluble in water.

== Preparation ==
Dysprosium(III) oxalate, as well as other lanthanide oxalates, can be prepared through "homogeneous precipitation induced by acid-catalyzed oxamic acid hydrolysis". Dysprosium(III) nitrate in dilute nitric acid is mixed with an excess of oxamic acid and the mixture is heated at 40°C until all oxamic acid dissolves. The temperature is then raised to 85°C and the solution is left for 7 hours, causing large crystals of dysprosium(III) oxalate to form as the oxalic acid is slowly generated.

== Uses ==
=== Phosphor materials ===
Under 364 nm UV light, dysprosium oxalate nanocrystals emit blue (480 nm), yellow (572 nm) and red (655 nm) light. As a result, they are suitable for white light emitting diodes (WLEDs) and offer advantages such as high luminescence efficiency, color repeatability, and low manufacturing cost over other technologies utilizing multiple components to achieve white light. They can be prepared by microwave-assisted co-precipitation using dysprosium nitrate hexahydrate, oxalic acid dihydrate, and ethylene glycol.

=== Metal organic frameworks ===
Several dysprosium oxalate metal organic frameworks (MOFs) have been synthesized. For example, the nine-coordinated 2D compound [Dy(C_{2}O_{4})_{1.5}(H_{2}O)_{3}]_{n}·2nH_{2}O can be prepared through a hydrothermal reaction of sodium oxalate and dysprosium(III) perchlorate hexahydrate. In addition, the 3D compound {[Dy(C_{2}O_{4})_{1.5}phen]·0.5H_{2}O}_{n} can be prepared through a hydrothermal reaction involving dysprosium(III) nitrate pentahydrate, oxalic acid, and phen (1,10-Phenanthroline). These dysprosium-based MOFs are of research interest in the field of single-molecule magnets (SMMs).
