= Yttrium oxalate =

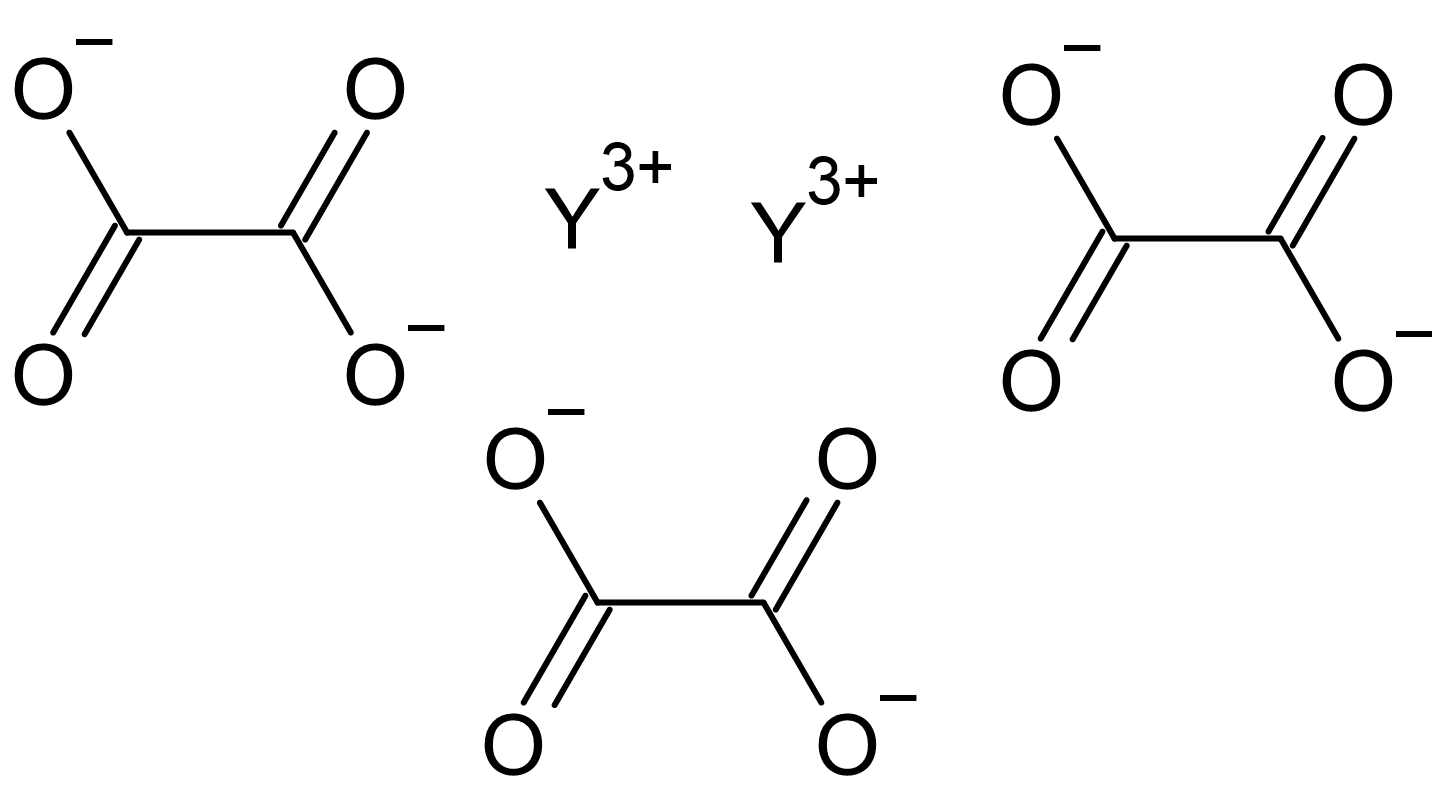

Names
- Other names Yttrium(3+) oxalate, Diyttrium trioxalate

Identifiers
CAS Number	867-68-5
3D model (JSmol)	Interactive image
ChemSpider	144422
ECHA InfoCard	100.011.607
EC Number	212-767-0
PubChem CID	164745
CompTox Dashboard (EPA)	DTXSID401014690
- InChI: InChI=1S/3C2H2O4.H2O.2Y/c3*3-1(4)2(5)6;;;/h3*(H,3,4)(H,5,6);1H2;;/q;;;;2*+3/p-6 Key: NRMHTSMZQQFBRX-UHFFFAOYSA-H
- SMILES: [Y+3].[Y+3].O=C([O-])C([O-])=O.[O-]C(=O)C([O-])=O.[O-]C(=O)C([O-])=O

Properties
Chemical formula	Y_{2}(C_{2}O_{4})_{3}
Molar mass	441.87
Appearance	White crystals
Solubility in water	insoluble
Solubility product (K_{sp})	5.1 × 10^{−30}.

Hazards
- GHS labelling
Pictograms	(GHS07: Exclamation mark)
Signal word	Warning
Hazard statements	H302, H302+H312, H312
Precautionary statements	P264, P270, P280, P301+P312, P302+P352, P312, P322, P330, P363, P501

Related compounds
Related compounds	Calcium oxalate Sodium oxalate Magnesium oxalate Strontium oxalate Barium oxalate Iron(II) oxalate Iron(III) oxalate Lithium oxalate Praseodymium oxalate
- Except where otherwise noted, data are given for materials in their standard state (at 25 °C [77 °F], 100 kPa). Infobox references

Yttrium oxalate is an inorganic compound, a salt of yttrium and oxalic acid with the chemical formula Y_{2}(C_{2}O_{4})_{3}. The compound does not dissolve in water and forms crystalline hydrates—colorless crystals.

== Synthesis ==
Precipitation of soluble yttrium salts with oxalic acid:

$$\mathsf{ 2YCl_3 + 3H_2C_2O_4 \ \xrightarrow{}\ Y_2(C_2O_4)_3\downarrow + 6HCl }$$

== Properties ==
Yttrium oxalate is highly insoluble in water and converts to the oxide when heated. Yttrium oxalate forms crystalline hydrates (colorless crystals) with the formula Y_{2}(C_{2}O_{4})_{3}•n H_{2}O, where n = 4, 9, and 10.

Decomposes when heated:

$$\mathsf{ Y_2(C_2O_4)_3 \ \xrightarrow{700^oC}\ Y_2O_3 + 3CO_2 + 3CO }$$

The solubility product of yttrium oxalate at 25 °C is 5.1 × 10^{−30}.

The trihydrate Y_{2}(C_{2}O_{4})_{3}•3H_{2}O is formed by heating more hydrated varieties at 110 °C.

Y_{2}(C_{2}O_{4})_{3}•2H_{2}O, which is formed by heating the decahydrate at 210 °C) forms monoclinic crystals with unit cell dimensions a=9.3811 Å, b=11.638 Å, c=5.9726 Å, β=96.079°.

== Related ==
Several yttrium oxalate double salts are known containing additional cations. Also a mixed-anion compound with carbonate is known.

formula	name	formula weight	crystal form	space group	unit cell Å	volume Å^{3}	properties	references
NH_{4}Y(C_{2}O_{4})_{2}.H_{2}O	Ammonium yttrium oxalate monohydrate		monoclinic	P2/n	a=9.18 b=6.09 c=7.89 β=90.2 Z=2			
[C_{6}N_{2}H_{16}]_{0.5}[Y(H_{2}O)(C_{2}O_{4})_{2}]·2H_{2}O		377.1	triclinic	P1̅	a = 8.229, b = 9.739, c = 9.754, α = 60.74, β = 72.36, γ = 84.67°, Z = 2	648.5	density 1.931	
[C_{5}N_{2}H_{12}][Y(C_{2}O_{4})_{2}]		365.1	monoclinic	Cc	a = 11.552, b = 17.168, c = 8.719, β = 130.64°, Z = 2	1312.1	density 1.848	
C_{5}NH_{6}Y(C_{2}O_{4})_{2}•3H_{2}O	Pyridinium yttrium oxalate trihydrate							
[Y(H_{2}O)]Na(C_{2}O_{4})_{2}.3H_{2}O	yttrium sodium oxalate tetrahydrate	360.005	monoclinic	Pc	a=8.623 b=8.6310 c=14.896 β=102.848 Z=4	1080.9		
YK(C_{2}O_{4})_{2}.4H_{2}O	Yttrium potassium oxalate tetrahydrate		tetragonal	I4_{1}/a	Z = 4 a = 11.4612, c = 8.9040	1169.6		
Y(H_{2}O)Cs(C_{2}O_{4})_{2}	Caesium yttrium oxalate monohydrate		monoclinic	P2/n	a = 8.979, b = 6.2299, c = 8.103, β = 90.05°	453.3		
RbLn(C_{2}O_{4})_{2}•3H_{2}O	Rubidium yttrium oxalate trihydrate							
[Y(H_{2}O)]_{2}(C_{2}O_{4})(CO_{3})_{2}	yttrium oxalate carbonate	421.876	orthorhombic	C222_{1}	a = 7.8177, b = 14.943, c = 9.4845, Z = 4	1108.0	density 2.526	
