= Tin(II) oxalate =

Names
- Other names Tin(II) oxalate, Stannous oxalate

Identifiers
CAS Number	814-94-8
3D model (JSmol)	Interactive image
ChemSpider	12597
ECHA InfoCard	100.011.285
EC Number	212-414-0
PubChem CID	13149
UNII	SAR72FE8EH
CompTox Dashboard (EPA)	DTXSID1061152
- InChI: InChI=1S/C2H2O4.Sn/c3-1(4)2(5)6;/h(H,3,4)(H,5,6);/q;+2/p-2 Key: OQBLGYCUQGDOOR-UHFFFAOYSA-L
- SMILES: C(=O)(C(=O)O)O.[Sn]

Properties
Chemical formula	C_{2}O_{4}Sn
Molar mass	206.728 g·mol^{−1}
Appearance	colorless crystals
Density	3.56
Melting point	280 °C (536 °F; 553 K)
Solubility in water	0.5 g/l

Hazards
- GHS labelling
Pictograms	(GHS05: Corrosive) (GHS07: Exclamation mark)
Signal word	Warning
Hazard statements	H302, H312, H318
Precautionary statements	P264, P270, P280, P301+P312, P302+P352, P305+P351+P338, P310, P312, P322, P330, P363, P501

Related compounds
Related compounds	Magnesium oxalate Strontium oxalate Barium oxalate Iron(II) oxalate Iron(III) oxalate Praseodymium oxalate
- Except where otherwise noted, data are given for materials in their standard state (at 25 °C [77 °F], 100 kPa). Infobox references

Tin(II) oxalate is an inorganic compound, a salt of tin and oxalic acid with the chemical formula SnC_{2}O_{4}. The compound looks like colorless crystals, does not dissolve in water, and forms crystalline hydrates.

== Synthesis ==
Effect of oxalic acid solution on tin(II) oxide :

$$\mathsf{ SnO + H_2C_2O_4 \ \xrightarrow{}\ SnC_2O_4\downarrow + H_2O }$$

Tin(II) oxalate can also be obtained by using tin(II) chloride and oxalic acid.

== Properties ==
Tin (II) oxalate forms colorless crystals.

Insoluble in water and acetone. Soluble in dilute HCl, methanol, and petroleum ether.

Forms crystal hydrates of the composition SnC_{2}O_{4}•n H_{2}O, where n = 1 and 2.

Decomposes on heating:

$$\mathsf{ SnC_2O_4 \ \xrightarrow{380^oC}\ SnO_2 + 2CO }$$

== Applications ==
- Tin oxalate is used as a catalyst in the production of organic esters and plasticizers.
- It is used for dyeing and printing fabrics.
- The compound is also used in stannous oral care compositions.
- Few studies have reported on the use of tin(II) oxalate as an anode material for rechargeable lithium batteries.
