= Copper(II) oxalate =

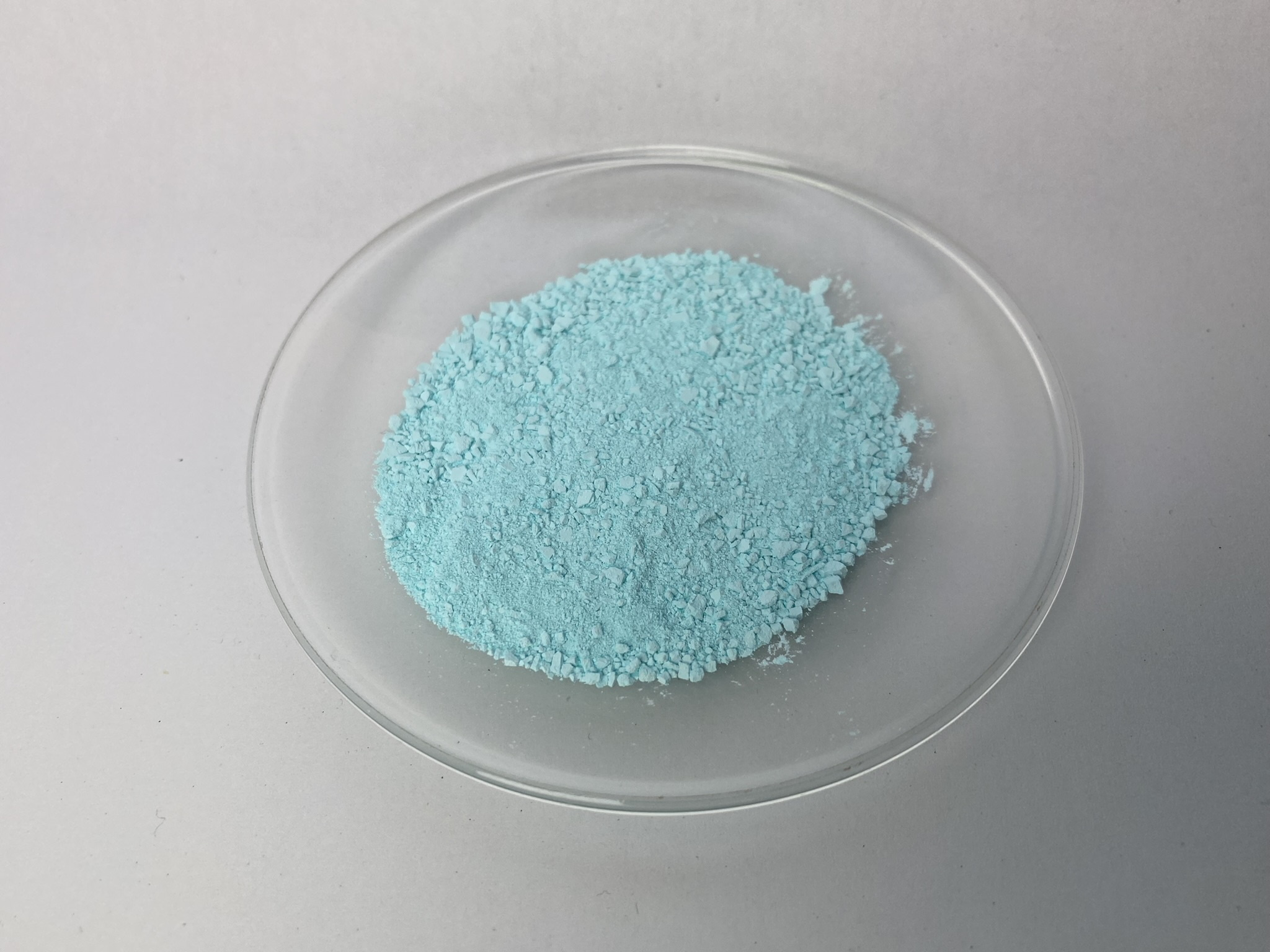

Names
- Other names Copper (II) oxalate, cupric oxalate, copper(2+) ethanedioate

Identifiers
CAS Number	814-91-5; hemihydrate: 55671-32-4
3D model (JSmol)	Interactive image
ChemSpider	12596
ECHA InfoCard	100.011.283
EC Number	212-411-4
PubChem CID	54602330
UNII	BN136S94FS
UN number	3077
CompTox Dashboard (EPA)	DTXSID0041802
- InChI: Key: QYCVHILLJSYYBD-UHFFFAOYSA-N; InChI=1S/C2H2O4.Cu/c3-1(4)2(5)6;/h(H,3,4)(H,5,6);/q;+2
- SMILES: O=C([O-])C([O-])=O.[Cu+2]

Properties
Chemical formula	CuC_{2}O_{4}
Molar mass	151.56
Appearance	blue solid
Density	6.57 g/cm^{3}
Solubility in water	insoluble
Solubility product (K_{sp})	4.43×10^{−10}

Hazards
- GHS labelling
Pictograms	(GHS07: Exclamation mark)
Signal word	Warning
Hazard statements	H302, H302+H312, H312
Precautionary statements	P264, P270, P280, P301+P312, P302+P352, P312, P322, P330, P363, P501

Thermochemistry
Std enthalpy of formation (Δ_{f}H^{⦵}_{298})	−751.3 kJ/mol

Related compounds
Related compounds	Calcium oxalate Sodium oxalate Magnesium oxalate Strontium oxalate Barium oxalate Iron(II) oxalate Iron(III) oxalate
- Except where otherwise noted, data are given for materials in their standard state (at 25 °C [77 °F], 100 kPa). Infobox references

Copper(II) oxalate is an inorganic compound with the chemical formula CuC_{2}O_{4}•(H_{2}O)_{x}. The value of x lies between 0 (anhydrous form) and 0.44. One of these species is found as the secondary mineral moolooite (0.44 hydrate). The anhydrous compound has been characterized by X-ray crystallography. Many transition metal oxalate complexes are known.

Copper(II) oxalate, whether anhydrous or hydrated, is practically insoluble in all solvents, as it is a coordination polymer.

== Synthesis ==
Copper(II) oxalate can be produced by precipitation from acidified aqueous copper(II) salts and oxalic acid or an alkali metal oxalate.

CuSO_{4} + H_{2}C_{2}O_{4} + H_{2}O → CuC_{2}O_{4}·H_{2}O + H_{2}SO_{4}

== Reactions ==
Upon heating to 130 °C, the hydrated copper(II) oxalates convert to the anhydrous cupric oxalate. Further heating at higher temperatures under an atmosphere of hydrogen gives copper metal, suitable as a reagent.

The hydrates bind Lewis bases.

Hydrated copper(II) oxalate reacts with alkali metal oxalates and ammonium oxalate to give bis(oxalato)cuprate:

(CuC_{2}O_{4})(H_{2}O)_{x} + C_{2}O^{2−}_{4} → [Cu(C_{2}O_{4})_{2}]^{2−} + x H_{2}O

== Uses ==
Copper oxalate is used as a catalyst for organic reactions, as a stabilizer for acetylated polyformaldehyde.

== Related compounds ==
- Cuprous oxalates.
