= Lithium oxalate =

Names
- IUPAC name Lithium oxalate
- Other names: Dilithium oxalate; di-Lithium oxalate; Oxalic acid dilithium salt

Identifiers
CAS Number	553-91-3
3D model (JSmol)	Interactive image
ChemSpider	61669
ECHA InfoCard	100.008.232
EC Number	209-054-1
PubChem CID	68383
UNII	K737OT0E73
CompTox Dashboard (EPA)	DTXSID4060288
- InChI: InChI=1S/C2H2O4-C.2Li/c3-1(4)2(5)6;;/h(H,3,4)(H,5,6);;/q;2*+1/p-2 Key: YNQRWVCLAIUHHI-UHFFFAOYSA-L
- SMILES: [Li+].[Li+].[O-]C(=O)C([O-])=O

Properties
Chemical formula	Li_{2}C_{2}O_{4}
Molar mass	101.90 g·mol^{−1}
Appearance	Colorless crystalline solid
Density	2.12 g/cm^{3}
Solubility in water	6.6 g per 100 g of water

Hazards
- GHS labelling
Pictograms	(GHS07: Exclamation mark)
Signal word	Warning
Hazard statements	H302, H312
Precautionary statements	P264, P270, P280, P301+P312, P302+P352, P312, P322, P330, P363, P501

Related compounds
Related compounds	Sodium oxalate; Potassium oxalate; Beryllium oxalate; Magnesium oxalate; Calcium oxalate; Strontium oxalate; Barium oxalate
- Except where otherwise noted, data are given for materials in their standard state (at 25 °C [77 °F], 100 kPa). Infobox references

Lithium oxalate is an organic compound with the chemical formula Li_{2}C_{2}O_{4}. It is a salt of lithium metal and oxalic acid. It consists of lithium cations Li^{+} and oxalate anions C_{2}O^{2−}_{4}. Lithium oxalate is soluble in water and converts to lithium carbonate when heated.

== Synthesis ==
One of the methods of synthesis is the reaction of direct neutralization of oxalic acid with lithium hydroxide:

2 LiOH + H_{2}C_{2}O_{4} → Li_{2}C_{2}O_{4} + 2 H_{2}O

== Properties ==
The compound crystallizes in the monoclinic system, cell parameters a = 3.400 Å, b = 5.156 Å, c = 9.055 Å, β = 95.60°, Z = 4.

Lithium oxalate decomposes when heated at 410–500 °C (770–932 °F; 683–773 K):

Li_{2}C_{2}O_{4} → Li_{2}CO_{3} + CO

== Applications ==
In pyrotechnics, the compound is used to color the flame red.
