= Beryllium oxalate =

Identifiers
CAS Number	3173-18-0
3D model (JSmol)	Interactive image
ChemSpider	4953986
PubChem CID	6451522
CompTox Dashboard (EPA)	DTXSID60185620
- InChI: InChI=1S/C2H2O4.Be/c3-1(4)2(5)6;/h(H,3,4)(H,5,6);/q;+2/p-2 Key: XQZGLPVUHKSNBQ-UHFFFAOYSA-L
- SMILES: [Be+2].C(=O)(C(=O)[O-])[O-]

Properties
Chemical formula	BeC_{2}O_{4}
Molar mass	97.03
Appearance	Transparent crystals
Boiling point	365.1 °C (689.2 °F; 638.2 K)
Solubility in water	Soluble

Hazards
Flash point	188.8 °C (371.8 °F; 461.9 K)

Related compounds
Related compounds	Calcium oxalate Sodium oxalate Magnesium oxalate Strontium oxalate Barium oxalate Iron(II) oxalate Iron(III) oxalate Lithium oxalate Praseodymium oxalate
- Except where otherwise noted, data are given for materials in their standard state (at 25 °C [77 °F], 100 kPa). Infobox references

Beryllium oxalate is an inorganic compound, a salt of beryllium metal and oxalic acid with the chemical formula BeC_{2}O_{4}. It forms colorless crystals, dissolves in water, and also forms crystalline hydrates. The compound is used to prepare ultra-pure beryllium oxide by thermal decomposition.

== Synthesis ==
The action of oxalic acid on beryllium hydroxide:

Be(OH)_{2} + H_{2}C_{2}O_{4} → BeC_{2}O_{4} + 2 H_{2}O

== Chemical properties ==
Crystalline hydrates lose water when heated to 100 °C (212 °F):

BeC_{2}O_{4}·3H_{2}O → BeC_{2}O_{4}·H_{2}O + 2 H_{2}O

And become anhydrous at 220 °C (428 °F):

BeC_{2}O_{4}·H_{2}O → BeC_{2}O_{4} + H_{2}O
