= Europium(III) oxalate =

Names
- IUPAC names Europium(III) oxalate
- Other names: Europium oxalate; Europium trioxalate

Identifiers
CAS Number	3269-12-3
3D model (JSmol)	Interactive image
ChemSpider	144739
ECHA InfoCard	100.019.896
EC Number	221-885-1
PubChem CID	165097
CompTox Dashboard (EPA)	DTXSID80939743
- InChI: InChI=1S/3C2H2O4.2Eu/c3*3-1(4)2(5)6;;/h3*(H,3,4)(H,5,6);;/q;;;2*+3/p-6 Key: PVDYMOCCGHXJAK-UHFFFAOYSA-H
- SMILES: C(=O)(C(=O)[O-])[O-].C(=O)(C(=O)[O-])[O-].C(=O)(C(=O)[O-])[O-].[Eu+3].[Eu+3]

Properties
Chemical formula	Eu_{2}(C_{2}O_{4})_{3}
Molar mass	567.985 g·mol^{−1} (anhydrous); 640.046 g·mol^{−1} (tetrahydrate); 676.077 g·mol^{−1} (hexahydrate); 748.138 g·mol^{−1} (decahydrate)
Appearance	colourless solid
Solubility in water	1,38 mg·l^{−1}

Hazards
- GHS labelling
Pictograms	(GHS05: Corrosive) (GHS07: Exclamation mark)
Signal word	Danger
Hazard statements	H314, H335
Precautionary statements	P261, P280, P304+P340, P305+P351+P338, P405, P501

Related compounds
Other cations	Cerium(III) oxalate; Gadolinium(III) oxalate; Holmium(III) oxalate; Lanthanum(III) oxalate; Neodymium(III) oxalate; Praseodymium(III) oxalate; Promethium(III) oxalate; Samarium(III) oxalate; Terbium(III) oxalate; Thulium(III) oxalate; Ytterbium(III) oxalate
- Except where otherwise noted, data are given for materials in their standard state (at 25 °C [77 °F], 100 kPa). Infobox references

Europium(III) oxalate (Eu_{2}(C_{2}O_{4})_{3}) is a chemical compound of europium and oxalic acid. There are different hydrates including the decahydrate, hexahydrate and tetrahydrate. Europium(II) oxalate is also known.

== Preparation ==
An excess of oxalate is added to a hot solution of Eu^{3+} cations. The resulting precipitate of Eu_{2}(C_{2}O_{4})_{3} ⋅ 10H_{2}O is dried in a desiccator.

== Properties ==
Europium(III) oxide (Eu_{2}O_{3}) can be prepared by calcining europium(III) oxalate.

The dehydration of Eu_{2}(C_{2}O_{4})_{3} · 10H_{2}O occurs below 200 °C:

Eu_{2}(C_{2}O_{4})_{3}·10H_{2}O → Eu_{2}(C_{2}O_{4})_{3}·6H_{2}O → Eu_{2}(C_{2}O_{4})_{3}·4H_{2}O → Eu_{2}(C_{2}O_{4})_{3}

The decomposition of this compound takes place in two stages, the first at 350 °C and the second at about 620 °C.

Eu_{2}(C_{2}O_{4})_{3} → Eu_{2}[CO_{3}]_{3} + 3 CO → Eu_{2}O_{3} + 3 CO_{2} + 3 CO

In the Mössbauer spectrum, Eu_{2}(C_{2}O_{4})_{3} · 10H_{2}O shows an isomer shift of +0,26 mm/s with a line width of 2,38 mm/s, in reference to EuF_{3}. The Debye temperature of Eu_{2}(C_{2}O_{4})_{3} is 166±15 K.

Eu_{2}(C_{2}O_{4})_{3} · 10H_{2}O crystallizes monoclinically in the space group of P2_{1}/c (space group no. 14) with the lattice parameters a = 1098, b = 961, c = 1004 pm and β = 114.2° with four formula units per unit cell.

Nanoparticles show a line emission when excited by a light source of 393 nm, the transitions ^{5}D_{0}→^{7}F_{1} (592 nm) and ^{5}D_{0}→^{7}F_{2} (616 nm) can then be found in the spectrum. This can be used as a red phosphor for white LEDs.
