= Glushinskite =

Mineral

General
- Category: Oxalate mineral
- Formula: Mg(C_{2}O_{4})·2H_{2}O
- IMA symbol: Gsk
- Strunz classification: 10.AB.10
- Crystal system: Monoclinic

Identification
- Luster: Sub-Adamantine
- Specific gravity: 1.85 g/cm3 (calculated)

Glushinskite is an oxalate mineral and the mineral form of magnesium oxalate. Occurrences of glushinskite are commonly associated with the growth of lichen on serpentinite.
