= Moolooite =

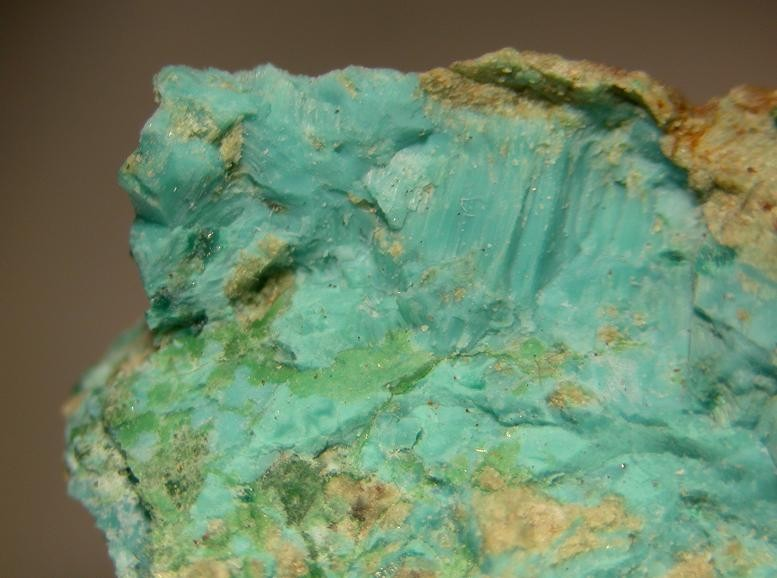
- Blue massive moolooite (field of view 12 mm)

General
- Category: Oxalate mineral
- Formula: Cu(C_{2}O_{4}) · 0.4H_{2}O
- IMA symbol: Moo
- Strunz classification: 10.AB.15
- Crystal system: Orthorhombic
- Crystal class: Dipyramidal (mmm); H-M symbol: (2/m 2/m 2/m)
- Space group: Pnnm

Identification
- Color: green
- Specific gravity: 3.43 (calculated)
- Density: 2.6

Moolooite is a rare blue-green mineral with the formula Cu(C_{2}O_{4})·n(H_{2}O) (n<1) (copper(II) oxalate hydrate). It was discovered in Bunbury Well, Mooloo Downs station, Murchison, Western Australia in 1986. It has an orthorhombic crystalline structure, and is formed by the interaction of bird guano with weathering copper sulfides.

A second occurrence is reported from the Sainte-Marie-aux-Mines silver mining district of Vosges Mountains, France.
