= Europium(II) oxalate =

Names
- Other names Europous oxalate

Identifiers
CAS Number	16842-38-9
3D model (JSmol)	Interactive image; monohydrate: Interactive image
PubChem CID	21918342
- InChI: InChI=1S/C2H2O4.Eu/c3-1(4)2(5)6;/h(H,3,4)(H,5,6);/q;+2/p-2 Key: NAIHEVFNOXUIIX-UHFFFAOYSA-L; monohydrate: InChI=1S/C2H2O4.Eu.H2O/c3-1(4)2(5)6;;/h(H,3,4)(H,5,6);;1H2/q;+2;/p-2 Key: IRKUGJJTADZRFV-UHFFFAOYSA-L
- SMILES: [Eu+2].[O-]C(=O)C(=O)[O-]; monohydrate: [Eu+2].[O-]C(=O)C(=O)[O-].O

Properties
Chemical formula	EuC_{2}O_{4}
Molar mass	239.98 g/mol
Appearance	Reddish-brown solid
- Except where otherwise noted, data are given for materials in their standard state (at 25 °C [77 °F], 100 kPa). Infobox references

Europium(II) oxalate is an inorganic compound of europium in the +2 oxidation state and the oxalate ion, with the formula EuC_{2}O_{4}. It is a reddish-brown solid and is known both as an anhydrous compound and as a monohydrate, EuC_{2}O_{4}·H_{2}O.

== Preparation ==
Europium(II) oxalate monohydrate can be prepared by reacting europium(II) sulfate with ammonium oxalate in aqueous solution:

EuSO_{4} + (NH_{4})_{2}C_{2}O_{4} + H_{2}O → EuC_{2}O_{4}·H_{2}O↓ + (NH_{4})_{2}SO_{4}

The preparation must be carried out under conditions that preserve europium in the divalent state.

== Properties ==
=== Hydrate and structure ===
Europium(II) oxalate forms a monohydrate that is isomorphous with strontium oxalate monohydrate.

The crystal water is lost on heating to about 160 °C, producing anhydrous EuC_{2}O_{4} without oxidation of Eu^{2+} to Eu^{3+}.

This retention of divalent europium during dehydration distinguishes it from many other europium compounds, in which oxidation to Eu(III) can occur relatively easily.

=== Magnetic properties ===
Both anhydrous europium(II) oxalate and its monohydrate order magnetically only at very low temperature.

Mössbauer and magnetic measurements found transition temperatures of approximately 1.9 ± 0.1 K for anhydrous EuC_{2}O_{4} and 2.8 ± 0.1 K for EuC_{2}O_{4}·H_{2}O.

The ^{151}Eu Mössbauer isomer shift is about −13.9 mm/s for both forms relative to a ^{151}Sm_{2}O_{3} source, consistent with divalent europium.

== Uses ==
Europium(II) oxalate can be used as a precursor for preparing europium monochalcogenides such as europium(II) sulfide, europium(II) selenide and europium(II) telluride.

Pink reported that europium oxalate was a more suitable starting material for obtaining phase-pure EuS, EuSe and EuTe than europium chloride.
