= Neodymium(III) oxalate =

Names
- IUPAC names Neodymium(III) oxalate Neodymium trioxalate
- Other names Neodymium oxalate

Identifiers
CAS Number	1186-50-1
3D model (JSmol)	Interactive image
ChemSpider	144468
ECHA InfoCard	100.013.357
EC Number	214-692-9
PubChem CID	164794
CompTox Dashboard (EPA)	DTXSID30920646
- InChI: InChI=1S/3C2H2O4.2Nd/c3*3-1(4)2(5)6;;/h3*(H,3,4)(H,5,6);;/q;;;2*+3/p-6 Key: VKLDOHAGZQSOPP-UHFFFAOYSA-H
- SMILES: [Nd+3].[Nd+3].[O-]C(=O)C(=O)[O-].[O-]C(=O)C(=O)[O-].[O-]C(=O)C(=O)[O-]

Properties
Chemical formula	Nd_{2}(C_{2}O_{4})_{3}
Appearance	rose-coloured crystal
Density	3.9 g·cm^{−3} (hexahydrate)
Solubility in water	insoluble

Related compounds
Other cations	Cerium(III) oxalate; Europium(III) oxalate; Gadolinium(III) oxalate; Holmium(III) oxalate; Lanthanum(III) oxalate; Praseodymium(III) oxalate; Promethium(III) oxalate; Samarium(III) oxalate; Terbium(III) oxalate; Thulium(III) oxalate; Ytterbium(III) oxalate
- Except where otherwise noted, data are given for materials in their standard state (at 25 °C [77 °F], 100 kPa). Infobox references

Neodymium(III) oxalate is the oxalate salt of neodymium, with the chemical formula of Nd_{2}(C_{2}O_{4})_{3} in the anhydrous or hydrate form. Its decahydrate decomposes to the anhydrous form when heated, and when heated further, decomposes to Nd_{2}O_{2}C_{2}O_{4}, finally obtaining neodymium(III) oxide. It dissolves in hydrochloric acid to form Nd(C_{2}O_{4})Cl·3H_{2}O.
