= Lanthanum oxalate =

Names
- Other names lanthanum(3+);oxalate, lanthanum sesquioxalate

Identifiers
CAS Number	537-03-1
3D model (JSmol)	Interactive image
ChemSpider	144342
ECHA InfoCard	100.007.871
EC Number	208-656-1
PubChem CID	164654
CompTox Dashboard (EPA)	30927256
- InChI: InChI=1S/3C2H2O4.2La/c3*3-1(4)2(5)6;;/h3*(H,3,4)(H,5,6);;/q;;;2*+3/p-6 Key: OXHNIMPTBAKYRS-UHFFFAOYSA-H
- SMILES: C(=O)(C(=O)[O-])[O-].C(=O)(C(=O)[O-])[O-].C(=O)(C(=O)[O-])[O-].[La+3].[La+3]

Properties
Chemical formula	C_{6}La_{2}O_{12}
Molar mass	541.87 g/mol
Appearance	colorless crystals
Density	g/cm^{3}
Solubility in water	poorly soluble

Hazards
- GHS labelling
Pictograms	(GHS07: Exclamation mark) (GHS09: Environmental hazard)
Signal word	Warning
Hazard statements	H302, H312, H317, H411
Precautionary statements	P261, P264, P270, P272, P273, P280, P301+P317, P302+P352, P317, P321, P330, P333+P317, P362+P364, P391, P501

Related compounds
Other cations	Cerium(III) oxalate; Europium(III) oxalate; Gadolinium(III) oxalate; Holmium(III) oxalate; Neodymium(III) oxalate; Praseodymium(III) oxalate; Promethium(III) oxalate; Samarium(III) oxalate; Terbium(III) oxalate; Thulium(III) oxalate; Ytterbium(III) oxalate
- Except where otherwise noted, data are given for materials in their standard state (at 25 °C [77 °F], 100 kPa). Infobox references

Lanthanum oxalate is an inorganic compound, a salt of lanthanum metal and oxalic acid with the chemical formula La_{2}(C_{2}O_{4})_{3}.

== Synthesis ==
Reaction of soluble lanthanum nitrate with an excess of oxalic acid:

2 La(NO_{3})_{3} + 3 (COOH)_{2} → La_{2}(C_{2}O_{4})_{3} + 6 HNO_{3}

Also, a reaction of lanthanum chloride with oxalic acid:

2 LaCl_{3} + 3 H_{2}C_{2}O_{4} → La_{2}(C_{2}O_{4})_{3} + 6 HCl

== Physical properties ==
Lanthanum(III) oxalate forms colorless crystals that are poorly soluble in water.

The compound forms various crystallohydrates La_{2}(C_{2}O_{4})_{3}•nH_{2}O, where n = 1, 2, 3, 7, and 10.

The crystallohydrates decompose when heated.
