= Thulium(III) oxalate =

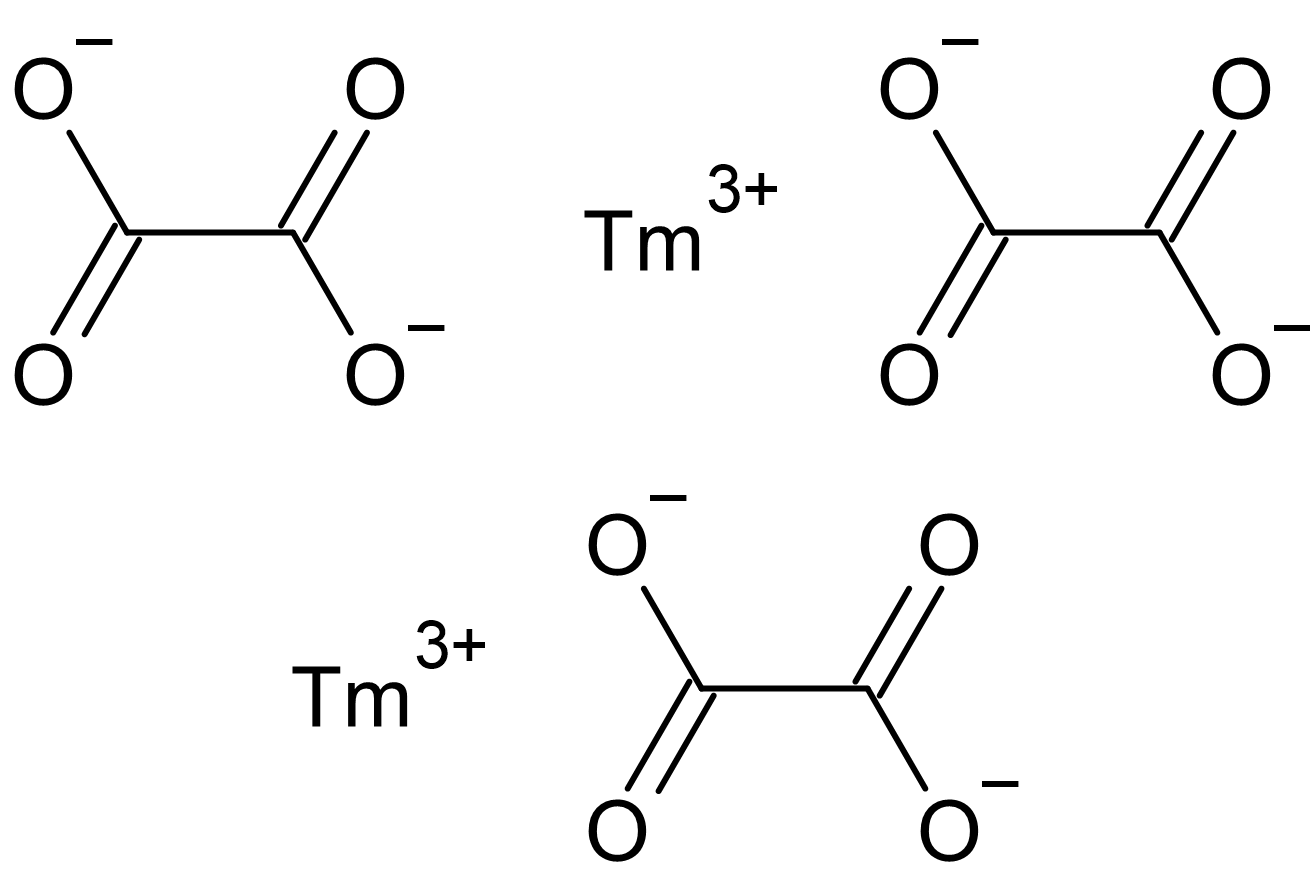

Identifiers
CAS Number	3269-17-8
3D model (JSmol)	Interactive image
ChemSpider	144741
ECHA InfoCard	100.019.898
EC Number	221-887-2
PubChem CID	165099
CompTox Dashboard (EPA)	DTXSID40954376
- InChI: InChI=1S/3C2H2O4.2Tm/c3*3-1(4)2(5)6;;/h3*(H,3,4)(H,5,6);;/q;;;2*+3/p-6 Key: BSCZSHAJTJRUPP-UHFFFAOYSA-H
- SMILES: [Tm+3].[Tm+3].[O-]C(=O)C(=O)[O-].[O-]C(=O)C(=O)[O-].[O-]C(=O)C(=O)[O-]

Properties
Chemical formula	Tm_{2}(C_{2}O_{4})_{3}
Appearance	solid

Hazards
- GHS labelling
Pictograms	(GHS07: Exclamation mark)
Signal word	Warning
Hazard statements	H302, H312
Precautionary statements	P264, P270, P280, P301+P317, P302+P352, P317, P321, P330, P362+P364, P501

Related compounds
Other cations	Cerium(III) oxalate; Europium(III) oxalate; Gadolinium(III) oxalate; Holmium(III) oxalate; Lanthanum(III) oxalate; Neodymium(III) oxalate; Praseodymium(III) oxalate; Promethium(III) oxalate; Samarium(III) oxalate; Terbium(III) oxalate; Ytterbium(III) oxalate
- Except where otherwise noted, data are given for materials in their standard state (at 25 °C [77 °F], 100 kPa). Infobox references

Thulium(III) oxalate is the oxalate of thulium with the chemical formula Tm_{2}(C_{2}O_{4})_{3}. Its hydrate can be prepared by reacting an aqueous solution of thulium(III) chloride and a benzene solution of dimethyl oxalate. Its pentahydrate is decomposed by heat to obtain the dihydrate, which is further heated to obtain thulium(III) oxide. It reacts with hydrochloric acid to obtain H[Tm(C_{2}O_{4})_{2}]·6H_{2}O.
