= Terbium(III) oxalate =

Identifiers
CAS Number	996-33-8
3D model (JSmol)	Interactive image
ChemSpider	144445
EC Number	213-632-9
PubChem CID	164770
CompTox Dashboard (EPA)	DTXSID30931030
- InChI: InChI=1S/3C2H2O4.2Tb/c3*3-1(4)2(5)6;;/h3*(H,3,4)(H,5,6);;/q;;;2*+3/p-6 Key: JZNKXIAEFQDQDF-UHFFFAOYSA-H
- SMILES: [Tb+3].[Tb+3].[O-]C(=O)C(=O)[O-].[O-]C(=O)C(=O)[O-].[O-]C(=O)C(=O)[O-]

Properties
Chemical formula	Tb_{2}(C_{2}O_{4})_{3}
Appearance	white solid, green under ultraviolet light (decahydrate)

Hazards
- GHS labelling
Pictograms	(GHS05: Corrosive) (GHS07: Exclamation mark)
Signal word	Danger
Hazard statements	H302, H312, H318
Precautionary statements	P264, P264+P265, P270, P280, P301+P317, P302+P352, P305+P354+P338, P317, P321, P330, P362+P364, P501

Related compounds
Other cations	Cerium(III) oxalate; Europium(III) oxalate; Gadolinium(III) oxalate; Holmium(III) oxalate; Lanthanum(III) oxalate; Neodymium(III) oxalate; Praseodymium(III) oxalate; Promethium(III) oxalate; Samarium(III) oxalate; Thulium(III) oxalate; Ytterbium(III) oxalate
- Except where otherwise noted, data are given for materials in their standard state (at 25 °C [77 °F], 100 kPa). Infobox references

Terbium(III) oxalate is the oxalate of terbium with the chemical formula Tb_{2}(C_{2}O_{4})_{3}. Its decahydrate can be obtained by reacting terbium(III) chloride and oxalic acid in an aqueous solution. Its decahydrate gradually loses water when heated and becomes anhydrous. Continued heating obtains terbium(III,IV) oxide. It decomposes in isolation from air to form terbium(III) oxide. The decomposed gas products are carbon monoxide and carbon dioxide. It reacts with hydrochloric acid to obtain H[Tb(C_{2}O_{4})_{2}]·6H_{2}O.
