= Holmium(III) oxalate =

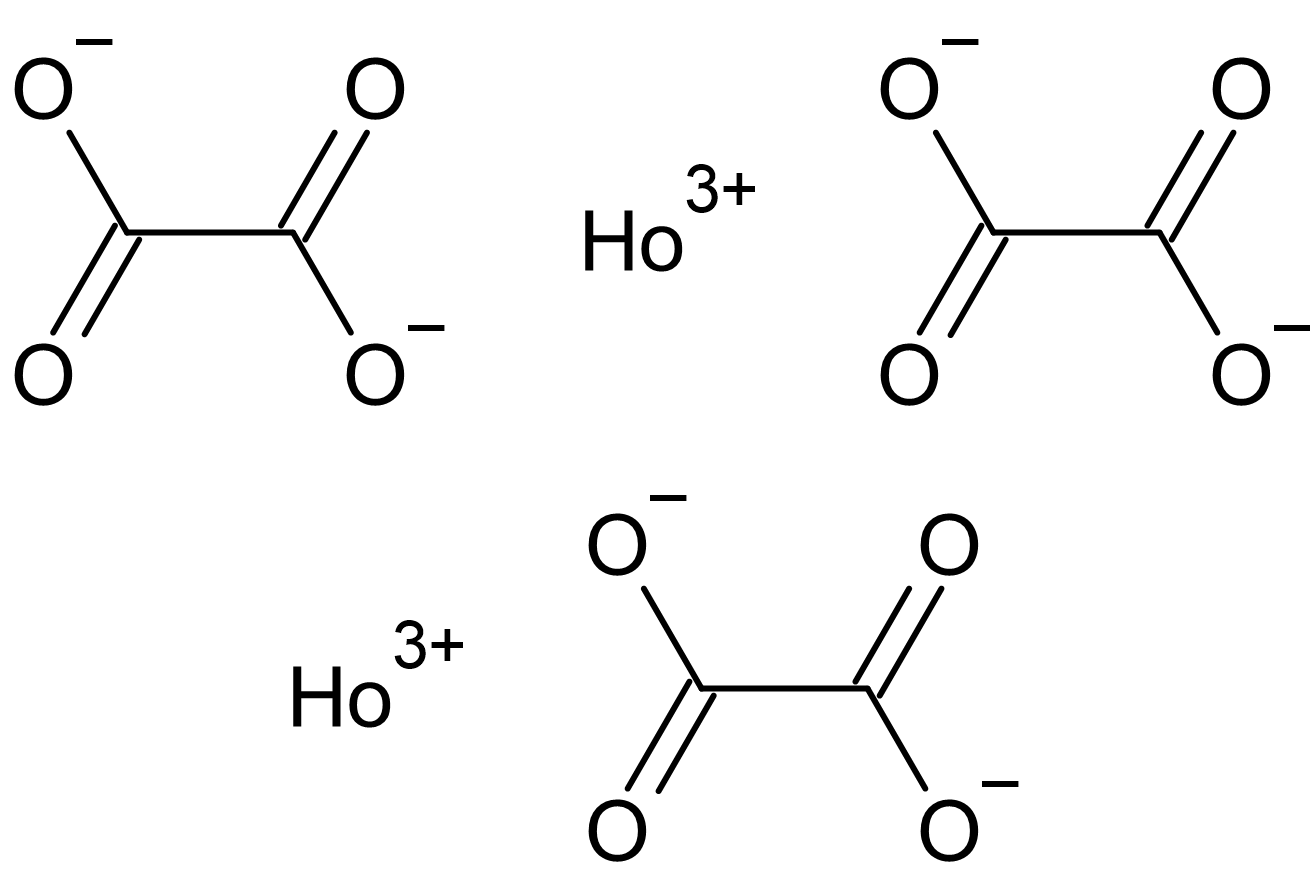

Identifiers
CAS Number	3269-15-6; decahydrate: 28965-57-3
3D model (JSmol)	Interactive image; dihydrate: Interactive image; decahydrate: Interactive image
ChemSpider	144740; decahydrate: 21428149
EC Number	221-886-7
PubChem CID	165098; decahydrate: 25021755
CompTox Dashboard (EPA)	DTXSID80954375; decahydrate: DTXSID90648470
- InChI: InChI=1S/3C2H2O4.2Ho/c3*3-1(4)2(5)6;;/h3*(H,3,4)(H,5,6);;/q;;;2*+3/p-6 Key: DYYFBWLZDJSPGO-UHFFFAOYSA-H; dihydrate: InChI=1S/3C2H2O4.2Ho.2H2O/c3*3-1(4)2(5)6;;;;/h3*(H,3,4)(H,5,6);;;2*1H2/q;;;2*+3;;/p-6 Key: MIBITVHERFMSTH-UHFFFAOYSA-H; decahydrate: InChI=1S/3C2H2O4.2Ho.10H2O/c3*3-1(4)2(5)6;;;;;;;;;;;;/h3*(H,3,4)(H,5,6);;;10*1H2/q;;;2*+3;;;;;;;;;;/p-6 Key: OKKLEXNPKBZYQY-UHFFFAOYSA-H
- SMILES: [Ho+3].[Ho+3].[O-]C(=O)C(=O)[O-].[O-]C(=O)C(=O)[O-].[O-]C(=O)C(=O)[O-]; dihydrate: [Ho+3].[Ho+3].[O-]C(=O)C(=O)[O-].[O-]C(=O)C(=O)[O-].[O-]C(=O)C(=O)[O-].O.O; decahydrate: [Ho+3].[Ho+3].[O-]C(=O)C(=O)[O-].[O-]C(=O)C(=O)[O-].[O-]C(=O)C(=O)[O-].O.O.O.O.O.O.O.O.O.O

Properties
Chemical formula	Ho_{2}(C_{2}O_{4})_{3}
Appearance	yellow crystals (heptahydrate)

Related compounds
Other cations	Cerium(III) oxalate; Europium(III) oxalate; Gadolinium(III) oxalate; Lanthanum(III) oxalate; Neodymium(III) oxalate; Praseodymium(III) oxalate; Promethium(III) oxalate; Samarium(III) oxalate; Terbium(III) oxalate; Thulium(III) oxalate; Ytterbium(III) oxalate
- Except where otherwise noted, data are given for materials in their standard state (at 25 °C [77 °F], 100 kPa). Infobox references

Holmium(III) oxalate is the oxalate salt of holmium, with the chemical formula Ho_{2}(C_{2}O_{4})_{3}. It exists in anhydrous and hydrated forms.

== Properties ==
Holmium(III) oxalate decahydrate decomposes in heat to obtain the dihydrate, which is further heated to obtain the anhydrous form, and finally holmium(III) oxide is obtained. It reacts with hydrochloric acid to obtain H[Ho(C_{2}O_{4})_{2}]·6H_{2}O.
