= Ytterbium(III) oxalate =

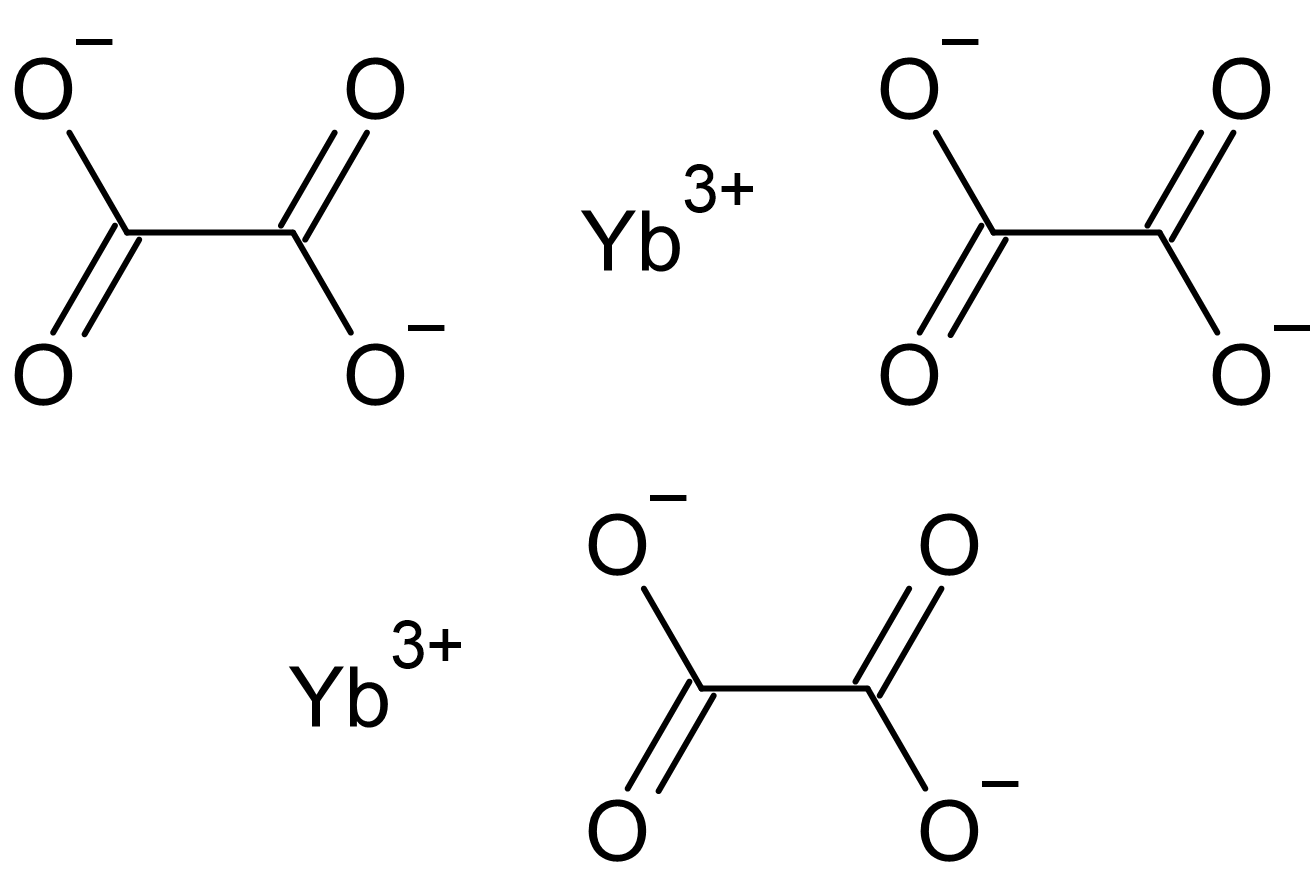

Identifiers
CAS Number	996-34-9
3D model (JSmol)	Interactive image
ChemSpider	144446
ECHA InfoCard	100.012.394
EC Number	213-633-4
PubChem CID	164771
CompTox Dashboard (EPA)	DTXSID20912611
- InChI: Key: FLJKBWKLGAYSFH-UHFFFAOYSA-H; InChI=1S/3C2H2O4.2Yb/c3*3-1(4)2(5)6;;/h3*(H,3,4)(H,5,6);;/q;;;2*+3/p-6
- SMILES: [Yb+3].[Yb+3].[O-]C(=O)C(=O)[O-].[O-]C(=O)C(=O)[O-].[O-]C(=O)C(=O)[O-]

Properties
Chemical formula	Yb_{2}(C_{2}O_{4})_{3}
Molar mass	610.14
Appearance	solid
Density	2.64 g/cm^{3}

Related compounds
Other cations	Cerium(III) oxalate; Europium(III) oxalate; Gadolinium(III) oxalate; Holmium(III) oxalate; Lanthanum(III) oxalate; Neodymium(III) oxalate; Praseodymium(III) oxalate; Promethium(III) oxalate; Samarium(III) oxalate; Terbium(III) oxalate; Thulium(III) oxalate
- Except where otherwise noted, data are given for materials in their standard state (at 25 °C [77 °F], 100 kPa). Infobox references

Ytterbium(III) oxalate is the oxalate of ytterbium, with the chemical formula Yb_{2}(C_{2}O_{4})_{3}.

== Preparation ==
Ytterbium(III) oxalate hydrate can be prepared by reacting an aqueous solution of ytterbium(III) chloride and a benzene solution of dimethyl oxalate.

== Properties ==
Ytterbium(III) oxalate pentahydrate is decomposed by heat to obtain the dihydrate, which is further heated to obtain ytterbium(III) oxide. It reacts with acids to obtain H[Yb(C_{2}O_{4})_{2}].6H_{2}O.
