= Promethium(III) oxalate =

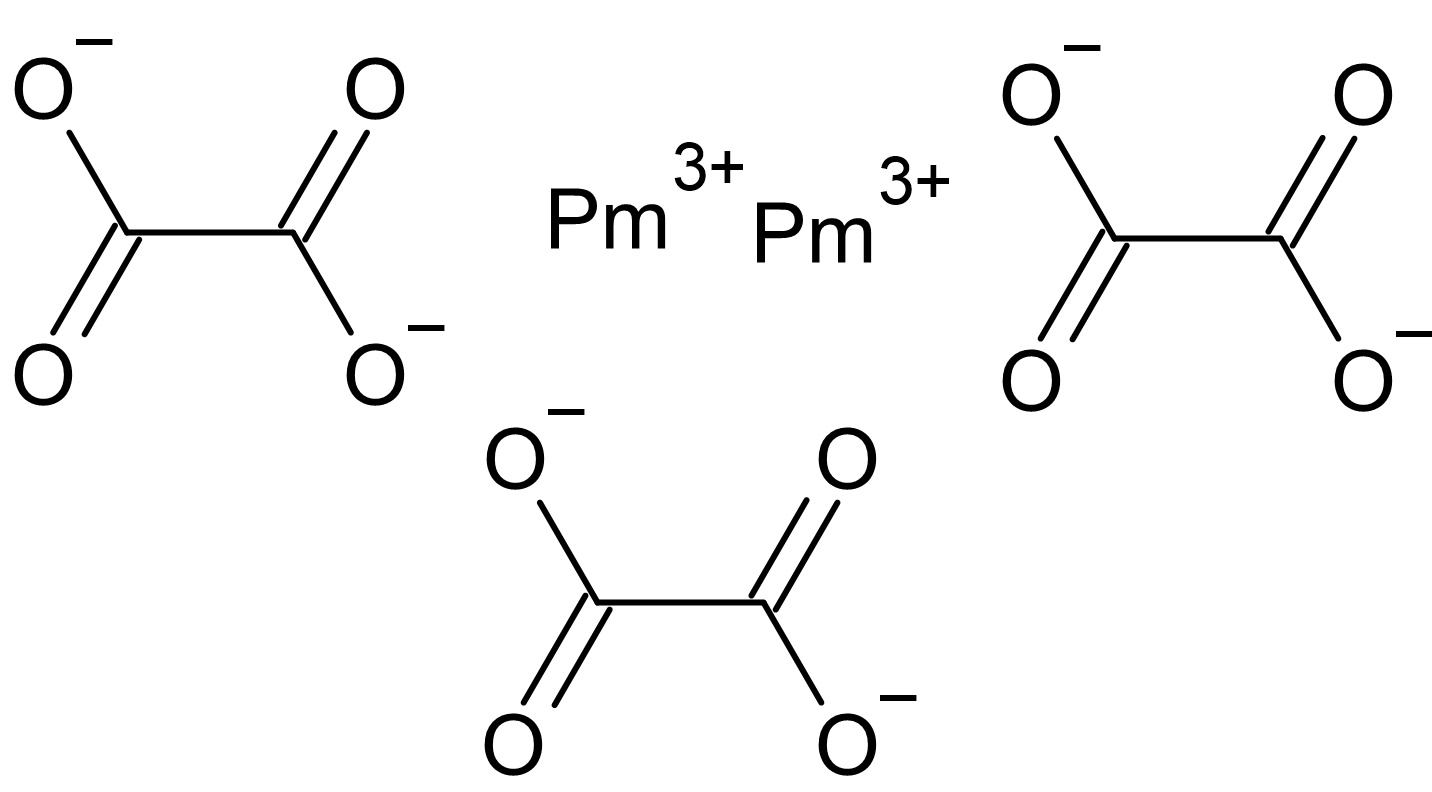

Identifiers
CAS Number	10561-77-0 anhydrous; trihydrate: 25880-55-1; decahydrate: 14462-37-4
3D model (JSmol)	Interactive image; trihydrate: Interactive image; decahydrate: Interactive image
- InChI: InChI=1S/3C2H2O4.2Pm/c3*3-1(4)2(5)6;;/h3*(H,3,4)(H,5,6);;/q;;;2*+3/p-6 Key: UVHJLJNPJSACAD-UHFFFAOYSA-H
- SMILES: C(=O)(C(=O)[O-])[O-].C(=O)(C(=O)[O-])[O-].C(=O)(C(=O)[O-])[O-].[Pm+3].[Pm+3]; trihydrate: C(=O)(C(=O)[O-])[O-].C(=O)(C(=O)[O-])[O-].C(=O)(C(=O)[O-])[O-].[Pm+3].[Pm+3].O.O.O; decahydrate: C(=O)(C(=O)[O-])[O-].C(=O)(C(=O)[O-])[O-].C(=O)(C(=O)[O-])[O-].[Pm+3].[Pm+3].O.O.O.O.O.O.O.O.O.O

Properties
Chemical formula	Pm_{2}(C_{2}O_{4})_{3}
Molar mass	559.93

Related compounds
Other cations	Cerium(III) oxalate; Europium(III) oxalate; Gadolinium(III) oxalate; Holmium(III) oxalate; Lanthanum(III) oxalate; Neodymium(III) oxalate; Praseodymium(III) oxalate; Samarium(III) oxalate; Terbium(III) oxalate; Thulium(III) oxalate; Ytterbium(III) oxalate
- Except where otherwise noted, data are given for materials in their standard state (at 25 °C [77 °F], 100 kPa). Infobox references

Promethium(III) oxalate is an oxalate of promethium, with the chemical formula Pm_{2}(C_{2}O_{4})_{3}. Its decahydrate crystallizes in the monoclinic crystal system with space group P2_{1}/m. Promethium(III) oxalate trihydrate can decompose into stable basic carbonate Pm_{2}O_{2}CO_{3}, and generate promethium(III) oxide at higher temperatures.

In all lanthanide oxalates, promethium(III) oxalate has the lowest solubility.
