= Gadolinium(III) oxalate =

Identifiers
CAS Number	867-64-1
3D model (JSmol)	Interactive image; decahydrate: Interactive image
ChemSpider	132965; decahydrate: 21241441
ECHA InfoCard	100.011.606
EC Number	212-766-5
PubChem CID	150859; decahydrate: 159625035
CompTox Dashboard (EPA)	DTXSID101014689
- InChI: InChI=1S/3C2H2O4.2Gd/c3*3-1(4)2(5)6;;/h3*(H,3,4)(H,5,6);;/q;;;2*+3/p-6 Key: SQORATIMOBOFKR-UHFFFAOYSA-H; decahydrate: InChI=1S/3C2H2O4.2Gd.10H2O/c3*3-1(4)2(5)6;;;;;;;;;;;;/h3*(H,3,4)(H,5,6);;;10*1H2/q;;;2*+3;;;;;;;;;;/p-6 Key: MOJMYWALZOTAOX-UHFFFAOYSA-H
- SMILES: [Gd+3].[Gd+3].[O-]C(=O)C(=O)[O-].[O-]C(=O)C(=O)[O-].[O-]C(=O)C(=O)[O-]; decahydrate: C(=O)(C(=O)[O-])[O-].C(=O)(C(=O)[O-])[O-].C(=O)(C(=O)[O-])[O-].O.O.O.O.O.O.O.O.O.O.[Gd+3].[Gd+3]

Properties
Chemical formula	Gd_{2}(C_{2}O_{4})_{3}
Molar mass	578.55 g/mol
Appearance	colorless crystals
Solubility in water	insoluble

Hazards
- GHS labelling
Pictograms	(GHS07: Exclamation mark)
Signal word	Warning
Hazard statements	H302, H302+H312+H332, H312, H315, H319, H332, H335
Precautionary statements	P261, P264, P264+P265, P270, P271, P280, P301+P317, P302+P352, P304+P340, P305+P351+P338, P317, P319, P321, P330, P332+P317, P337+P317, P362+P364, P403+P233, P405, P501

Related compounds
Other cations	Cerium(III) oxalate; Europium(III) oxalate; Holmium(III) oxalate; Lanthanum(III) oxalate; Neodymium(III) oxalate; Praseodymium(III) oxalate; Promethium(III) oxalate; Samarium(III) oxalate; Terbium(III) oxalate; Thulium(III) oxalate; Ytterbium(III) oxalate
- Except where otherwise noted, data are given for materials in their standard state (at 25 °C [77 °F], 100 kPa). Infobox references

Gadolinium oxalate is an inorganic compound with the chemical formula Gd_{2}(C_{2}O_{4})_{3}. Its hydrate can be prepared by the reaction of gadolinium nitrate and oxalic acid.

== Properties ==
The decahydrate of gadolinium oxalate thermally decomposes to obtain the anhydrous form, which can then be heated to produce gadolinium oxide.

Gadolinium oxalate reacts with hydrochloric acid to produce Gd(C_{2}O_{4})Cl.

It also reacts with sodium hydroxide under hydrothermal conditions to produce gadolinium hydroxide.
