= Samarium(III) oxalate =

Names
- Other names Tris(oxalato)disamarium, Samarium oxalate,

Identifiers
CAS Number	3252-68-4
3D model (JSmol)	Interactive image
ChemSpider	144736
EC Number	221-844-8
PubChem CID	165093
CompTox Dashboard (EPA)	DTXSID50920648
- InChI: InChI=1S/3C2H2O4.2Sm/c3*3-1(4)2(5)6;;/h3*(H,3,4)(H,5,6);;/q;;;2*+3/p-6 Key: DABIZUXUJGHLMW-UHFFFAOYSA-H
- SMILES: C(=O)(C(=O)[O-])[O-].C(=O)(C(=O)[O-])[O-].C(=O)(C(=O)[O-])[O-].[Sm+3].[Sm+3]

Properties
Chemical formula	C_{6}O_{12}Sm_{2}
Molar mass	564.77 g·mol^{−1}
Appearance	Yellow crystals
Solubility in water	Insoluble

Hazards
- GHS labelling
Pictograms	(GHS07: Exclamation mark)
Signal word	Warning
Hazard statements	H302, H312
Precautionary statements	P264, P270, P280, P301+P312, P302+P352, P312, P322, P330, P363, P501

Related compounds
Other cations	Cerium(III) oxalate; Europium(III) oxalate; Gadolinium(III) oxalate; Holmium(III) oxalate; Lanthanum(III) oxalate; Neodymium(III) oxalate; Praseodymium(III) oxalate; Promethium(III) oxalate; Terbium(III) oxalate; Thulium(III) oxalate; Ytterbium(III) oxalate
- Except where otherwise noted, data are given for materials in their standard state (at 25 °C [77 °F], 100 kPa). Infobox references

Samarium(III) oxalate is an inorganic compound, a salt of samarium and oxalic acid with the formula Sm_{2}(C_{2}O_{4})_{3}. The compound does not dissolve in water, forms a crystalline hydrate with yellow crystals.

== Synthesis ==
Precipitation of soluble samarium salts with oxalic acid:

$$\mathsf{ 2SmCl_3 + 3H_2C_2O_4 \ \xrightarrow{}\ Sm_2(C_2O_4)_3\downarrow + 6HCl }$$

Also a reaction of samarium nitrate and oxalic acid in an aqueous solution:

$$\mathsf{ 2Sm(NO_3)_3 + 3H_2C_2O_4 \ \xrightarrow{}\ Sm_2(C_2O_4)_3\downarrow + 6HNO_3 }$$

== Physical properties ==
Samarium(III) oxalate forms a crystalline hydrate of the composition Sm_{2}(C_{2}O_{4})_{3} • 10H_{2}O with yellow crystals.

== Chemical properties ==
Decomposes on heating:

$$\mathsf{ Sm_2(C_2O_4)_3 \ \xrightarrow{800^oC}\ Sm_2O_3 + 3CO_2 + 3CO }$$

Crystalline hydrate Sm_{2}(C_{2}O_{4})_{3} • 10H_{2}O decomposes stepwise.
