= Cerium oxalate =

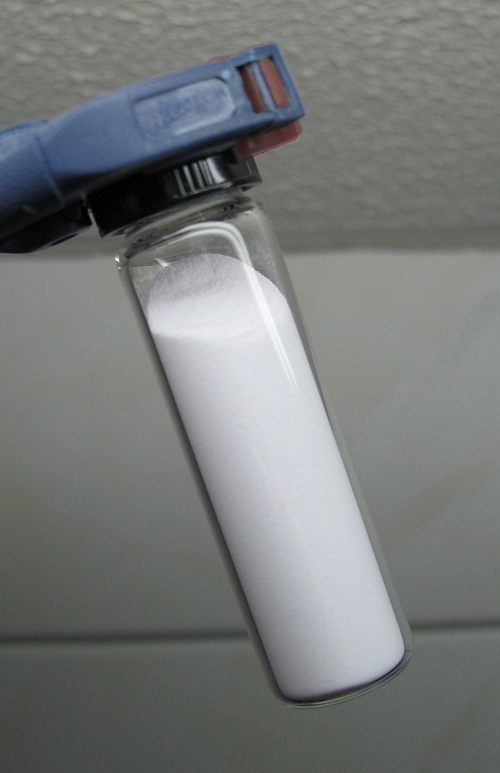

Names
- IUPAC name Cerium(III) oxalate
- Other names: Cerium oxalate; Cerous oxalate

Identifiers
CAS Number	139-42-4
3D model (JSmol)	Interactive image
ChemSpider	145101
ECHA InfoCard	100.004.875
PubChem CID	165565
UNII	96P72VE680
- InChI: InChI=1S/3C2H2O4.2Ce/c3*3-1(4)2(5)6;;/h3*(H,3,4)(H,5,6);;/q;;;2*+3/p-6 Key: ZMZNLKYXLARXFY-UHFFFAOYSA-H
- SMILES: C(=O)(C(=O)[O-])[O-].C(=O)(C(=O)[O-])[O-].C(=O)(C(=O)[O-])[O-].[Ce+3].[Ce+3]

Properties
Chemical formula	C_{6}Ce_{2}O_{12}
Molar mass	544.286 g·mol^{−1}
Appearance	White crystals
Melting point	Decomposes
Solubility in water	Slightly soluble

Pharmacology
ATC code	A04AD02 (WHO)

Hazards
- Occupational safety and health (OHS/OSH)
Main hazards	Corrosive, Irritant, Respiratory irritant, Toxic
- GHS labelling
Pictograms	(GHS05: Corrosive) (GHS06: Toxic) (GHS08: Health hazard)
Signal word	Danger
Hazard statements	H301, H311, H314, H319, H331, H335, H370
Precautionary statements	P260, P264, P270, P271, P280, P301+P310, P302+P352, P304+P340, P305+P351+P338, P308+P313, P332+P313, P403+P233
NFPA 704 (fire diamond)	3 0 1
Flash point	188.8 °C
Safety data sheet (SDS)	External SDS

Related compounds
Other cations	Europium(III) oxalate; Gadolinium(III) oxalate; Holmium(III) oxalate; Lanthanum(III) oxalate; Neodymium(III) oxalate; Praseodymium(III) oxalate; Promethium(III) oxalate; Samarium(III) oxalate; Terbium(III) oxalate; Thulium(III) oxalate; Ytterbium(III) oxalate
- Except where otherwise noted, data are given for materials in their standard state (at 25 °C [77 °F], 100 kPa). verify (what is ?) Infobox references

Cerium(III) oxalate (cerous oxalate) is the inorganic cerium salt of oxalic acid. It is a white crystalline solid with the chemical formula of Ce_{2}(C_{2}O_{4})_{3}. It can be obtained by the reaction of oxalic acid with cerium(III) chloride.

== Uses ==
Cerium(III) oxalate is used as an antiemetic. It has been identified as part of the invisible ink that was used by Stasi operatives during the Cold War.

== Toxicity ==
Cerium(III) oxalate irritates skin and mucous membranes, and is a strong irritant to eyes. If it gets into the eyes, there is a danger of severe eye injury.

Cerium salts increase the blood coagulation rate, and exposure to cerium salts can cause sensitivity to heat.

Oxalates are corrosive to tissue and are powerful irritants. They have a caustic effect on the linings of the digestive tracts and can cause kidney damage.
