= Strontium oxalate =

Names
- IUPAC name Strontium oxalate

Identifiers
| CAS Number | 814-95-9 |
| 3D model (JSmol) | Interactive image |
| ChemSpider | 63140 |
| ECHA InfoCard | 100.011.286 |
| EC Number | 212-415-6 |
| PubChem CID | 69947 |
| UNII | 7IAW7E69NI |
| CompTox Dashboard (EPA) | DTXSID80883590 |
- InChI: InChI=1S/C2H2O4.Sr/c3-1(4)2(5)6;/h(H,3,4)(H,5,6);/q;+2/p-2 Key: KQAGKTURZUKUCH-UHFFFAOYSA-L
- SMILES: [Sr+2].[O-]C(=O)C([O-])=O

Properties
| Chemical formula | SrC_{2}O_{4} |
| Molar mass | 175.64 g·mol^{−1} |
| Appearance | White powder |
| Density | 2.08 g/cm^{3} |
| Melting point | 150 °C (302 °F; 423 K) (monohydrate, decomposes) |
| Solubility in water | 4.6 mg/100 g at 18 °C (64 °F); 5 g/100 g at 100 °C (212 °F) |
| Solubility in Acetic acid | 52.6 mg/100 g (3.5% acid); 870 mg/100 g (23% acid) |

Hazards
- GHS labelling
| Pictograms | (GHS07: Exclamation mark) |
| Signal word | Warning |
| Hazard statements | H302, H312 |
| Precautionary statements | P280 |
| NFPA 704 (fire diamond) | 2 0 0 |

Related compounds
| Other anions | Strontium acetate; Strontium carbonate |
| Other cations | Beryllium oxalate; Magnesium oxalate; Sodium oxalate; Potassium oxalate; Calcium oxalate; Barium oxalate; Praseodymium oxalate |
- Except where otherwise noted, data are given for materials in their standard state (at 25 °C [77 °F], 100 kPa). Infobox references

Strontium oxalate is a compound with the chemical formula SrC_{2}O_{4}. Strontium oxalate can exist either in a hydrated form (SrC_{2}O_{4}·nH_{2}O) or as the acidic salt of strontium oxalate (SrC_{2}O_{4}·mH_{2}C_{2}O_{4}·nH_{2}O).

== Use in pyrotechnics ==
With the addition of heat, strontium oxalate will decompose based on the following reaction:

SrC_{2}O_{4} → SrO + CO_{2} + CO

Strontium oxalate is a useful red color emitter for use in pyrotechnics. It decomposes into strontium oxide, a good scarlet red emitter with two strong peaks at 595 and 597 nm. The oxide reacts with moisture in the atmosphere to form the hydroxide, so its three strong peaks of 682 nm, 671 nm, and 606 nm are also relevant.

Decomposition produces carbon monoxide (CO), which can reduce the broad spectrum emitter magnesium oxide (MgO) which can wash out colors to magnesium gas, resulting in a more transparent flame. This makes it a better emitter than other common strontium compounds in the presence of magnesium:

MgO(s) + CO → Mg(g) + CO_{2}

When magnesium is not present, there is no benefit from the production of CO gas and strontium carbonate is usually preferable.

Chlorine donors or chlorinated oxidizers result in a shift towards formation of strontium chloride (SrCl_{2}) which produces a slightly different, deeper red spectrum, having its three strongest peaks at 674 nm, 661 nm, and 636 nm.
