= Calcium oxalate =

Calcium salt of oxalic acid

- Calcium oxalate

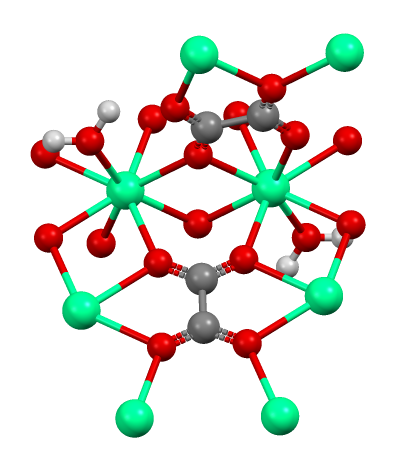
- structure of calcium oxalate monohydrate at 328 K Structure of calcium oxalate monohydrate Calcium, Ca Carbon, C Oxygen, O Hydrogen, H

Names
- Preferred IUPAC name Calcium oxalate
- Systematic IUPAC name Calcium ethanedioate
- Other names Oxalate of lime

Identifiers
CAS Number	5794-28-5 (monohydrate); 25454-23-3 (dihydrate); 192389-49-4 (trihydrate)
3D model (JSmol)	Interactive image
ChEBI	CHEBI:60579
ChEMBL	ChEMBL3184709
ChemSpider	30549
ECHA InfoCard	100.008.419
EC Number	209-260-1
KEGG	C17478
PubChem CID	16212978
UNII	4PP86KK527 (monohydrate)
CompTox Dashboard (EPA)	DTXSID6027214
- InChI: InChI=1S/C2H2O4.Ca/c3-1(4)2(5)6;/h(H,3,4)(H,5,6);/q;+2/p-2 Key: QXDMQSPYEZFLGF-UHFFFAOYSA-L; InChI=1/C2H2O4.Ca/c3-1(4)2(5)6;/h(H,3,4)(H,5,6);/q;+2/p-2 Key: QXDMQSPYEZFLGF-NUQVWONBAM
- SMILES: C(=O)(C(=O)[O-])[O-].[Ca+2]

Properties
Chemical formula	CaC_{2}O_{4}
Molar mass	128.096 g·mol^{−1}
Appearance	colourless or white crystals (anhydrous and hydrated forms)
Density	2.20 g/cm^{3}, monohydrate
Melting point	200 °C (392 °F; 473 K) decomposes (monohydrate)
Solubility in water	0.61 mg/(100 g) H_{2}O (20 °C)
Solubility product (K_{sp})	2.7 × 10^{−9} for CaC_{2}O_{4}

Hazards
- Occupational safety and health (OHS/OSH)
Main hazards	Harmful, Irritant
- GHS labelling
Pictograms	(GHS07: Exclamation mark)
Signal word	Warning
Hazard statements	H302, H312
Precautionary statements	P280
NFPA 704 (fire diamond)	2 1 1
Safety data sheet (SDS)	External SDS

Related compounds
Other anions	Calcium carbonate Calcium acetate Calcium formate
Other cations	Sodium oxalate Beryllium oxalate Magnesium oxalate Strontium oxalate Barium oxalate Radium oxalate Iron(II) oxalate Iron(III) oxalate
Related compounds	Oxalic acid
- Except where otherwise noted, data are given for materials in their standard state (at 25 °C [77 °F], 100 kPa). verify (what is ?) Infobox references

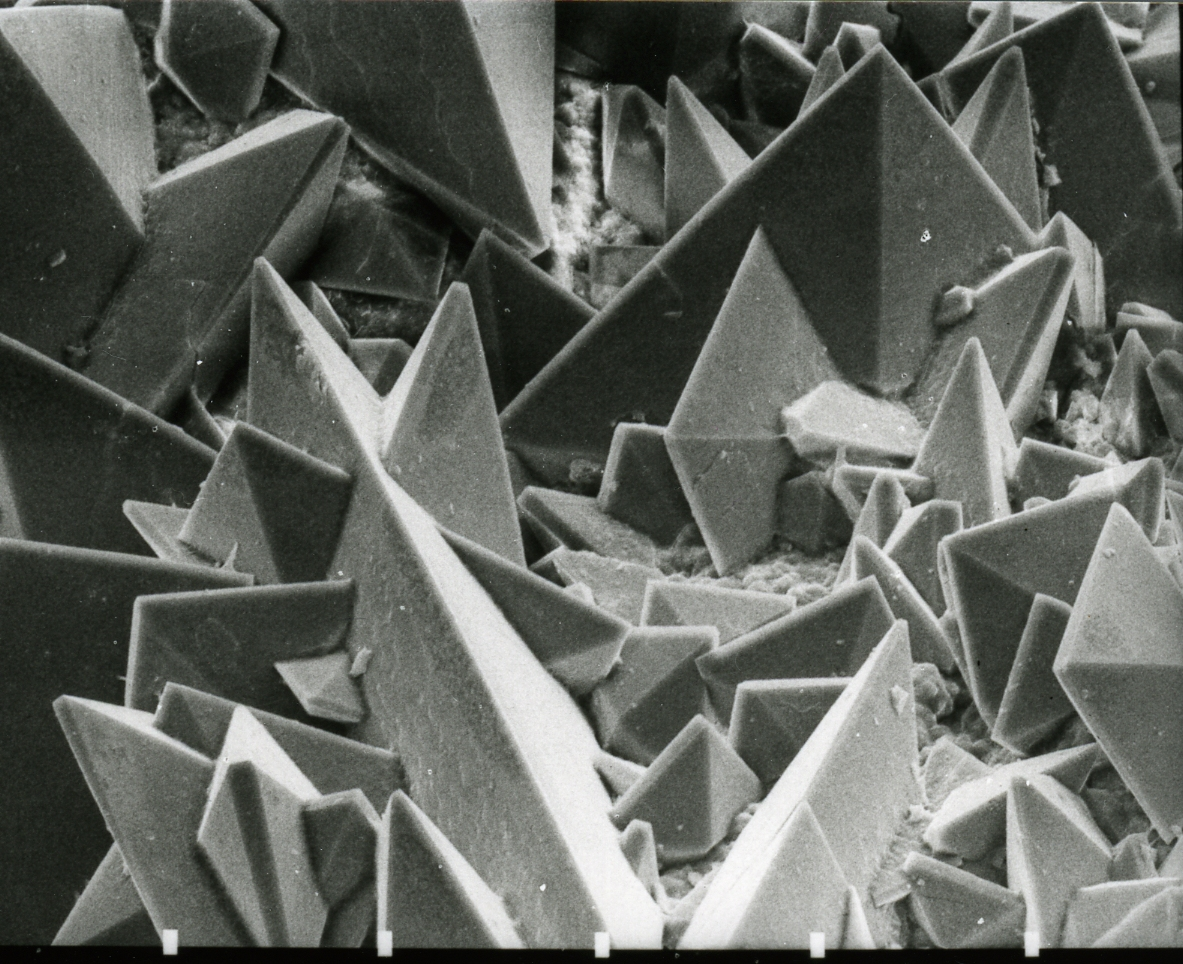
Scanning electron micrograph of the surface of a kidney stone showing tetragonal crystals of Weddellite (calcium oxalate dihydrate) emerging from the amorphous central part of the stone (the horizontal length of the picture represents 0.5 mm of the figured original)

Calcium oxalate (in archaic terminology, oxalate of lime) is a calcium salt of oxalic acid with the chemical formula CaC_{2}O_{4} or Ca(COO)_{2}. It forms hydrates CaC_{2}O_{4}·nH_{2}O, where n varies from 1 to 3. Anhydrous and all hydrated forms are colorless or white. The monohydrate CaC_{2}O_{4}·H_{2}O occurs naturally as the mineral whewellite, forming envelope-shaped crystals, known in plants as raphides. The two rarer hydrates are dihydrate CaC_{2}O_{4}·2H_{2}O, which occurs naturally as the mineral weddellite, and trihydrate CaC_{2}O_{4}·3H_{2}O, which occurs naturally as the mineral caoxite, are also recognized. Some foods have high quantities of calcium oxalates and can produce sores and numbing on ingestion and may even be fatal. Cultural groups with diets that depend highly on fruits and vegetables high in calcium oxalate, such as those in Micronesia, reduce the level of it by boiling and cooking them. They are a constituent in 76% of human kidney stones. Calcium oxalate is also found in beerstone, a scale that forms on containers used in breweries.

== Occurrence ==
Many plants accumulate calcium oxalate as it has been reported in more than 1000 different genera of plants. The calcium oxalate accumulation is linked to the detoxification of calcium (Ca^{2+}) in the plant. Upon decomposition, the calcium oxalate is oxidised by bacteria, fungi, or wildfire to produce the soil nutrient calcium carbonate.

The poisonous plant dumb cane (Dieffenbachia) contains the substance and on ingestion can prevent speech and be suffocating. It is also found in sorrel, rhubarb (in large quantities in the leaves), cinnamon, turmeric and in species of Oxalis, Araceae, Arum italicum, taro, kiwifruit, tea leaves, agaves, Virginia creeper (Parthenocissus quinquefolia), and Alocasia and in spinach in varying amounts. Plants of the genus Philodendron contain enough calcium oxalate that consumption of parts of the plant can result in uncomfortable symptoms. Insoluble calcium oxalate crystals are found in plant stems, roots, and leaves and produced in idioblasts. Vanilla plants exude calcium oxalates upon harvest of the orchid seed pods and may cause contact dermatitis.

Calcium oxalate crystals are commonly found in lichens, where they occur in two mineral forms: weddellite (CaC_{2}O_{4}·(2+x)H_{2}O) and whewellite (CaC_{2}O_{4}·H_{2}O). These crystals can form both on the surface of the lichen as a powdery coating called pruina and within the internal structures of the lichen thallus. The type and distribution of these crystals often correlates with environmental conditions: weddellite typically forms in dry environments and can serve as a water source for the lichen, while whewellite is more common in moist habitats. In addition to water regulation, calcium oxalate crystals in lichens serve several protective functions, including shielding against excessive sunlight and potentially helping to neutralize pollutants such as sulfur dioxide. The formation of these crystals is linked to the lichen's ability to dissolve calcium from rocky substrates through the production of oxalic acid, with the amount of calcium oxalate often correlating with the calcium content of the substrate on which the lichen grows.

Calcium oxalate, as ‘beerstone’, is a brownish precipitate that tends to accumulate within vats, barrels, and other containers used in the brewing of beer. If not removed in a cleaning process, beerstone will leave an unsanitary surface that can harbour microorganisms. Beerstone is composed of calcium and magnesium salts and various organic compounds left over from the brewing process; it promotes the growth of unwanted microorganisms that can adversely affect a batch of beer.

Calcium oxalate crystals in the urine are the most common constituent of human kidney stones, and calcium oxalate crystal formation is also one of the toxic effects of ethylene glycol poisoning.

== Chemical properties ==
Calcium oxalate is a combination of calcium ions and the conjugate base of oxalic acid, the oxalate anion. Its aqueous solutions are slightly basic because of the basicity of the oxalate ion. The basicity of calcium oxalate is weaker than that of sodium oxalate, due to its lower solubility in water. Solid calcium oxalate hydrate has been characterized by X-ray crystallography. It is a coordination polymer featuring planar oxalate anions linked to calcium, which also has water ligands.

== Medical significance ==
Calcium oxalate can produce sores and numbing on ingestion and may even be fatal.

=== Morphology and diagnosis ===
The monohydrate and dihydrate can be distinguished by the shape of the respective crystals.

- Calcium oxalate dihydrate crystals are octahedral. A large portion of the crystals in a urine sediment will have this type of morphology, as they can grow at any pH and naturally occur in normal urine.
- Calcium oxalate monohydrate crystals vary in shape, and can be shaped like dumbbells, spindles, ovals, or picket fences, the last of which is most commonly seen due to ethylene glycol poisoning.
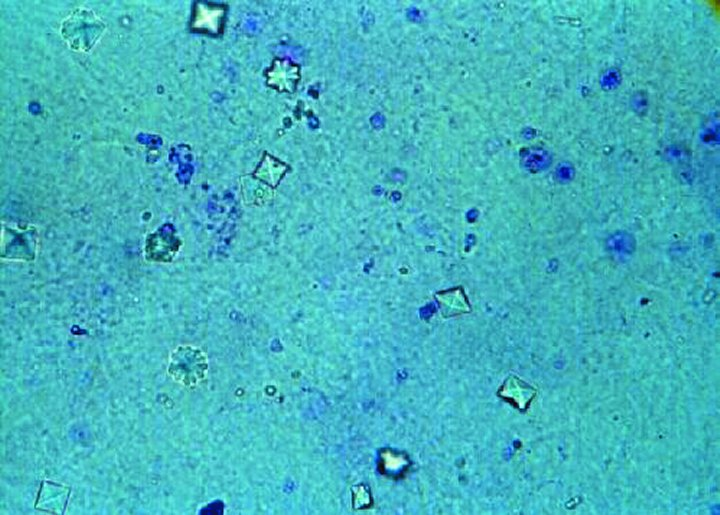
Urine microscopy showing calcium oxalate crystals in the urine. The octahedral crystal morphology is clearly visible.

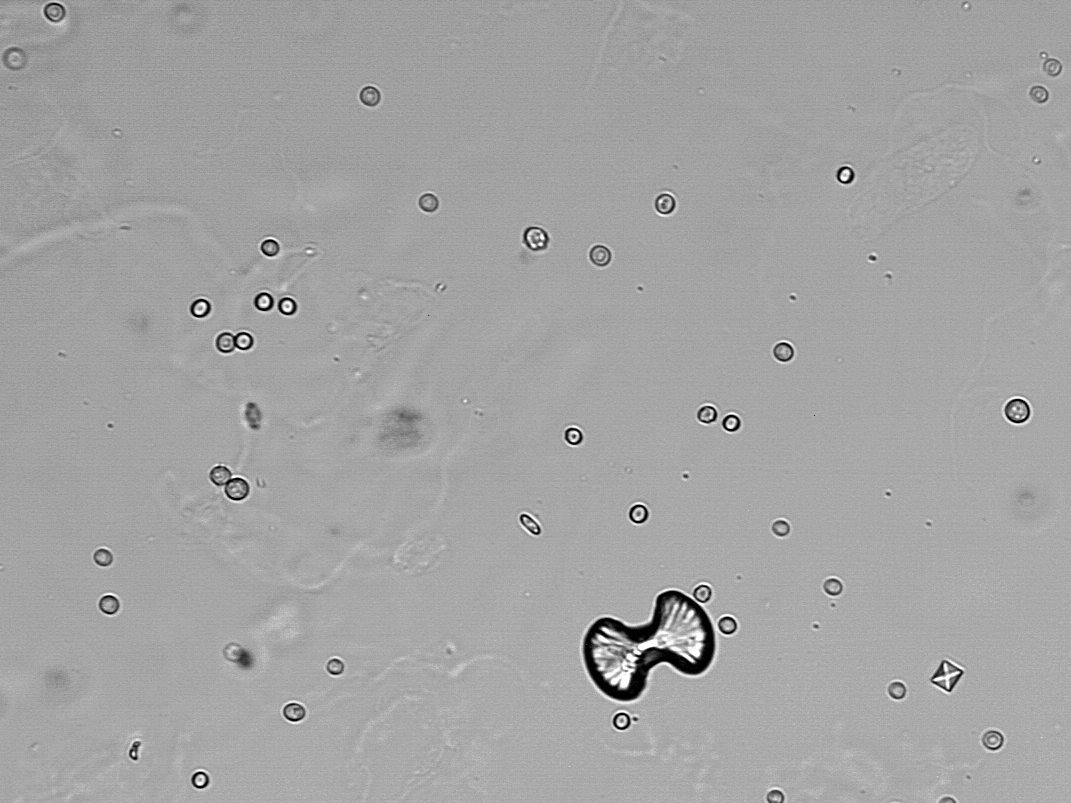
Urine microscopy showing a calcium oxalate monohydrate crystal (dumbbell shaped) and a calcium oxalate dihydrate crystal (envelope shaped) along with several erythrocytes.

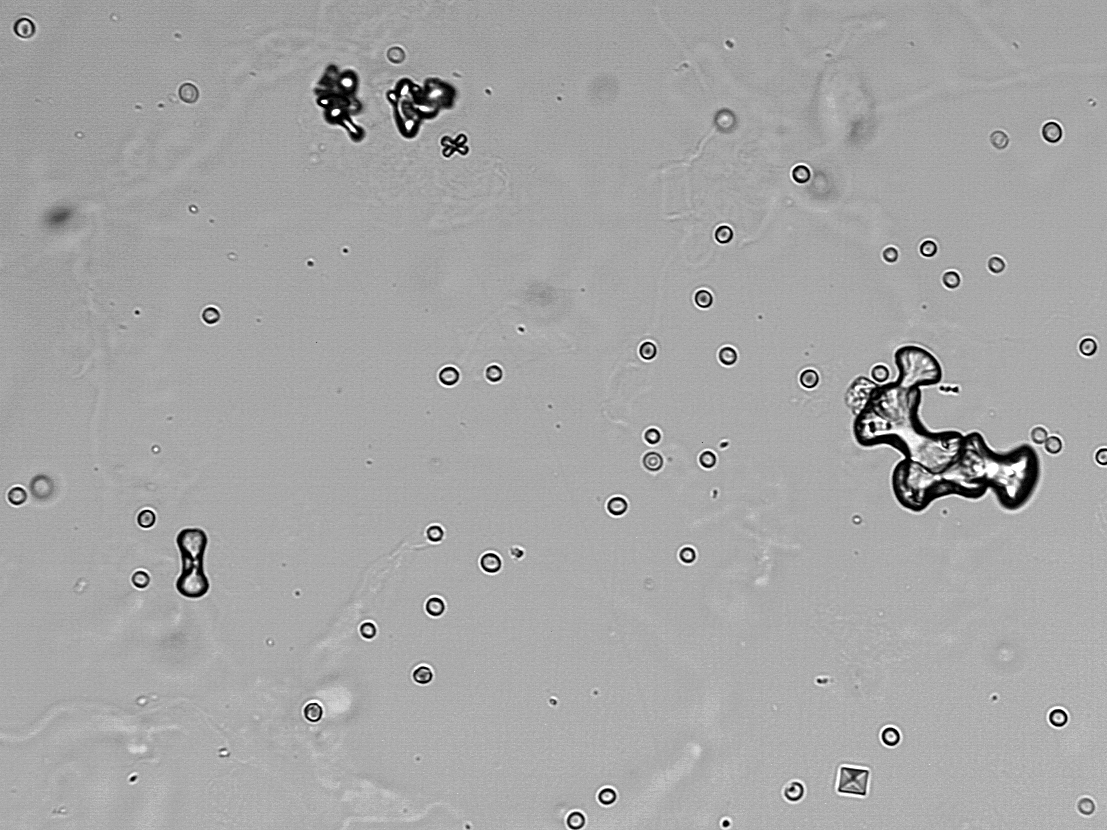
Urine microscopy showing several calcium oxalate monohydrate crystals (dumbbell shaped, some of them clumped) and a calcium oxalate dihydrate crystal (envelope shaped) along with several erythrocytes.

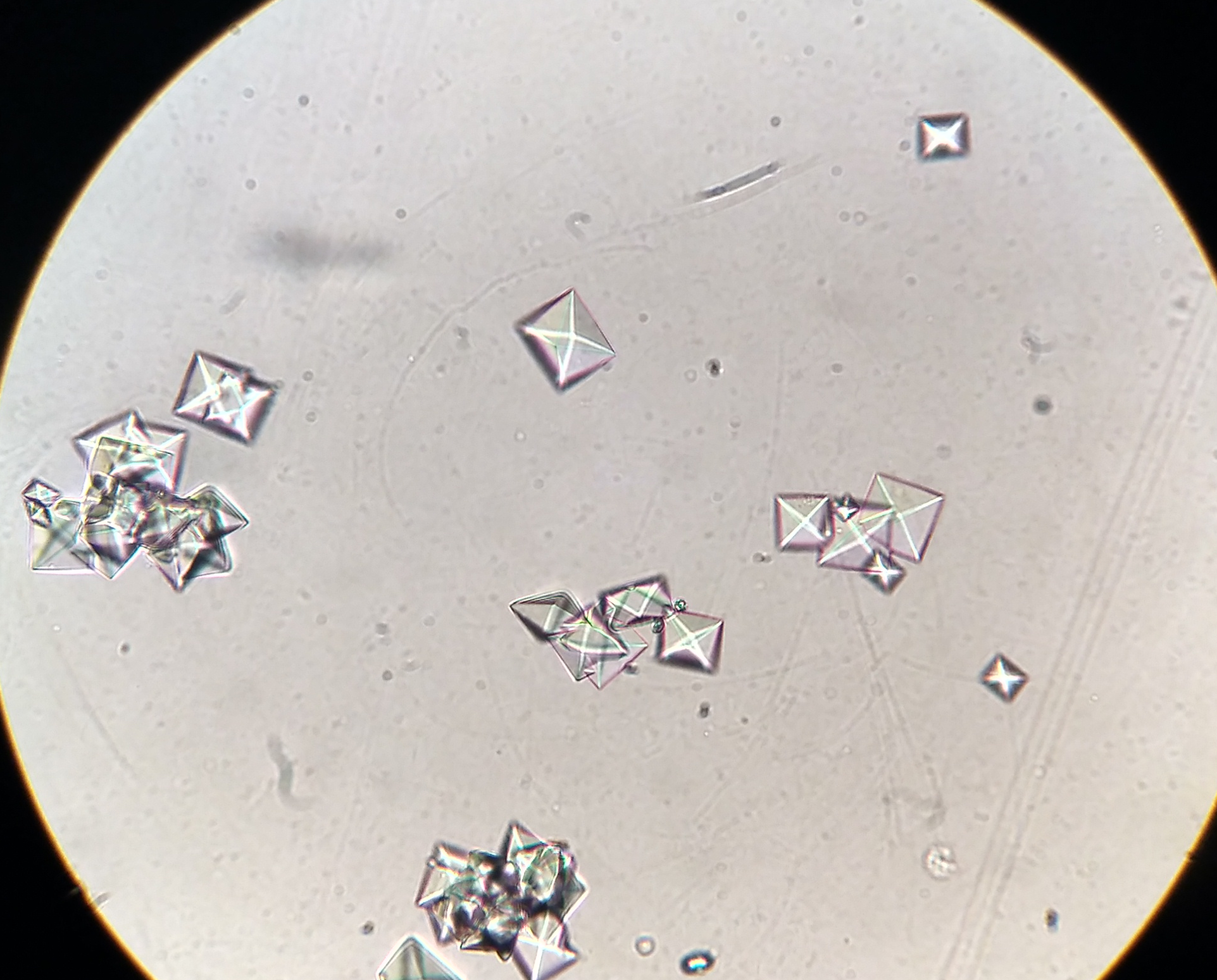
Urinary sediment showing several calcium oxalate crystals. 40X

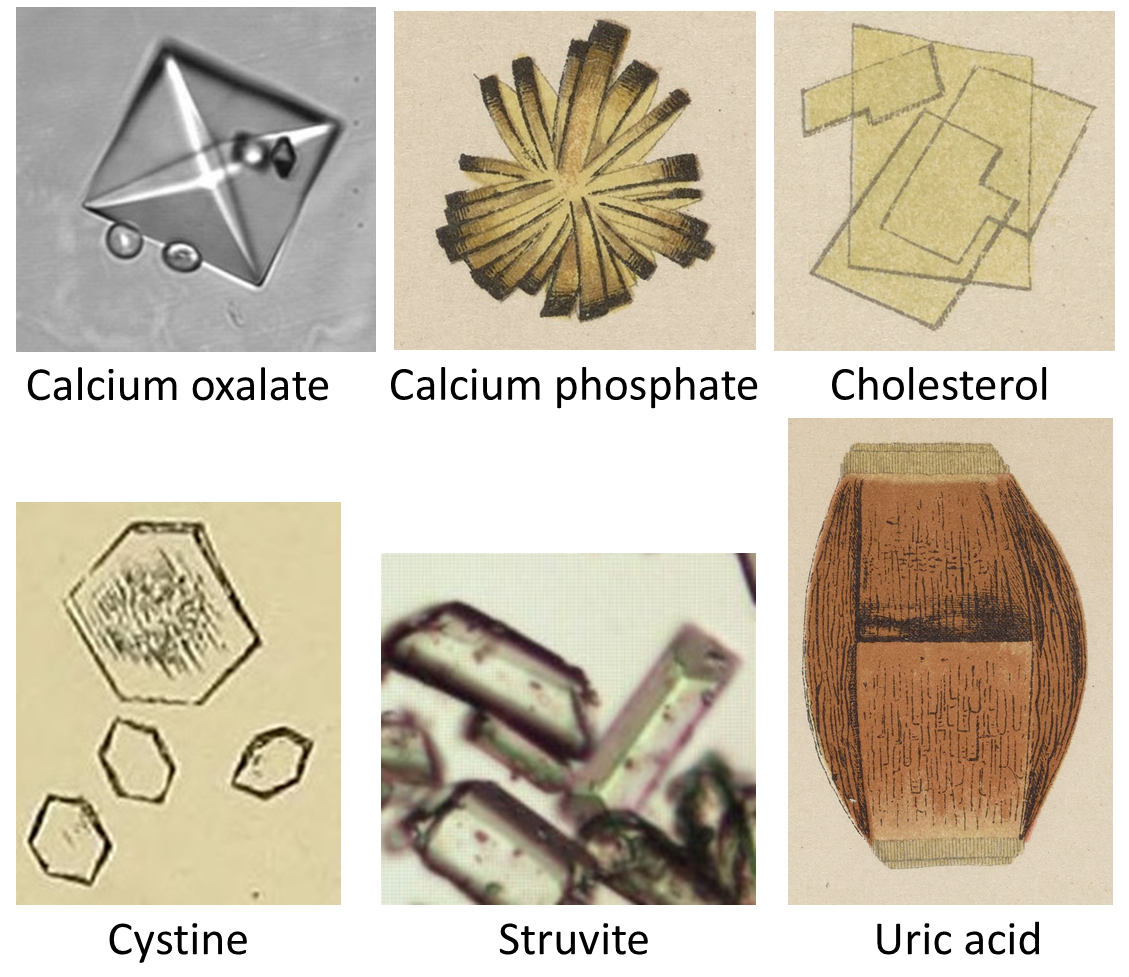
Comparison of different types of urinary stones.

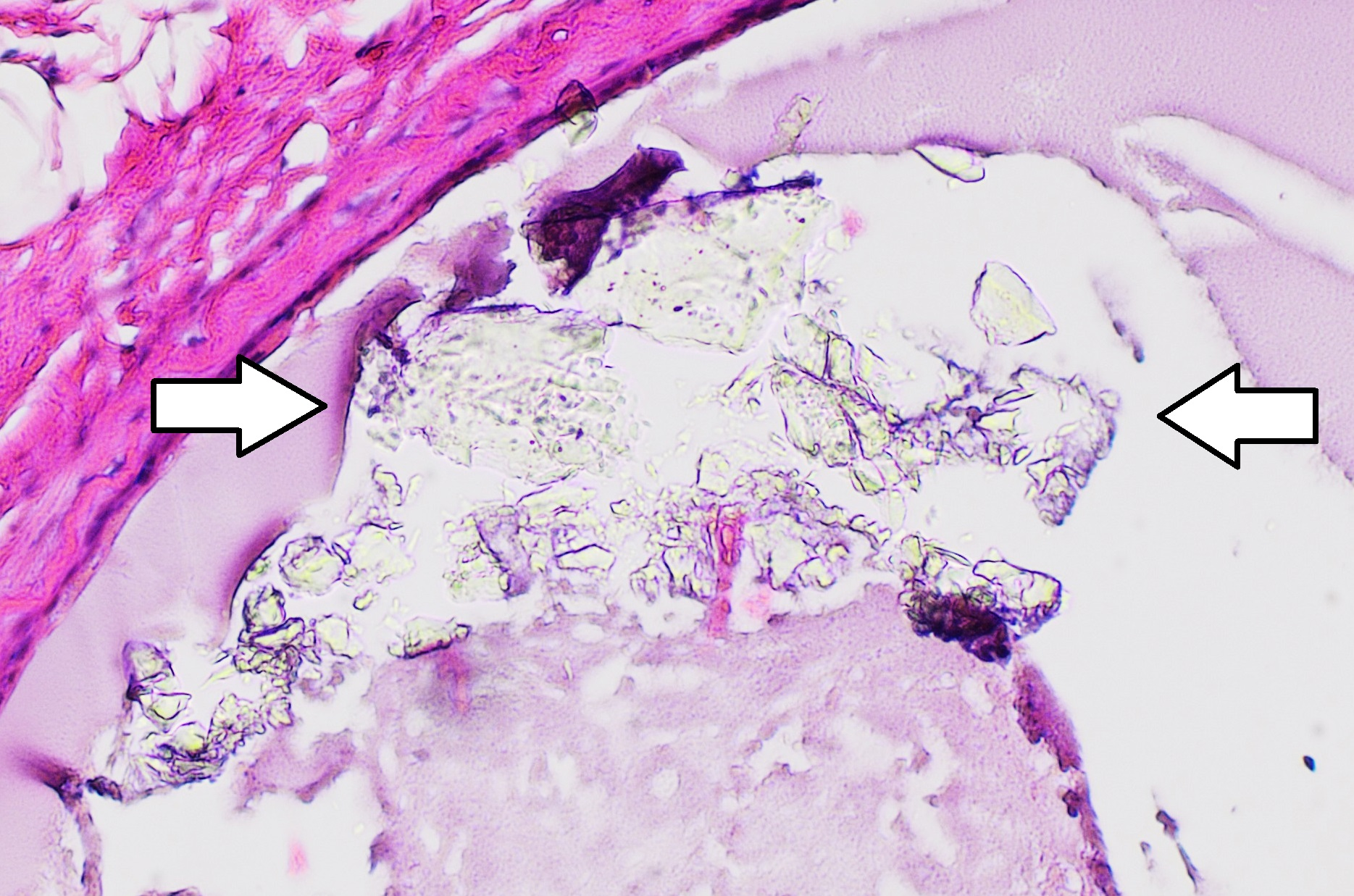
Histopathology of calcium oxalate crystals in a benign breast cyst, H&E stain. In the breast, they can be seen on mammography and are usually benign, but can be associated with lobular carcinoma in situ.

=== Kidney stones ===
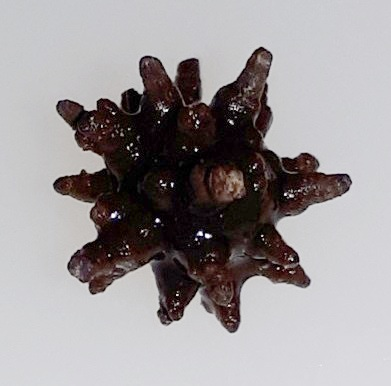
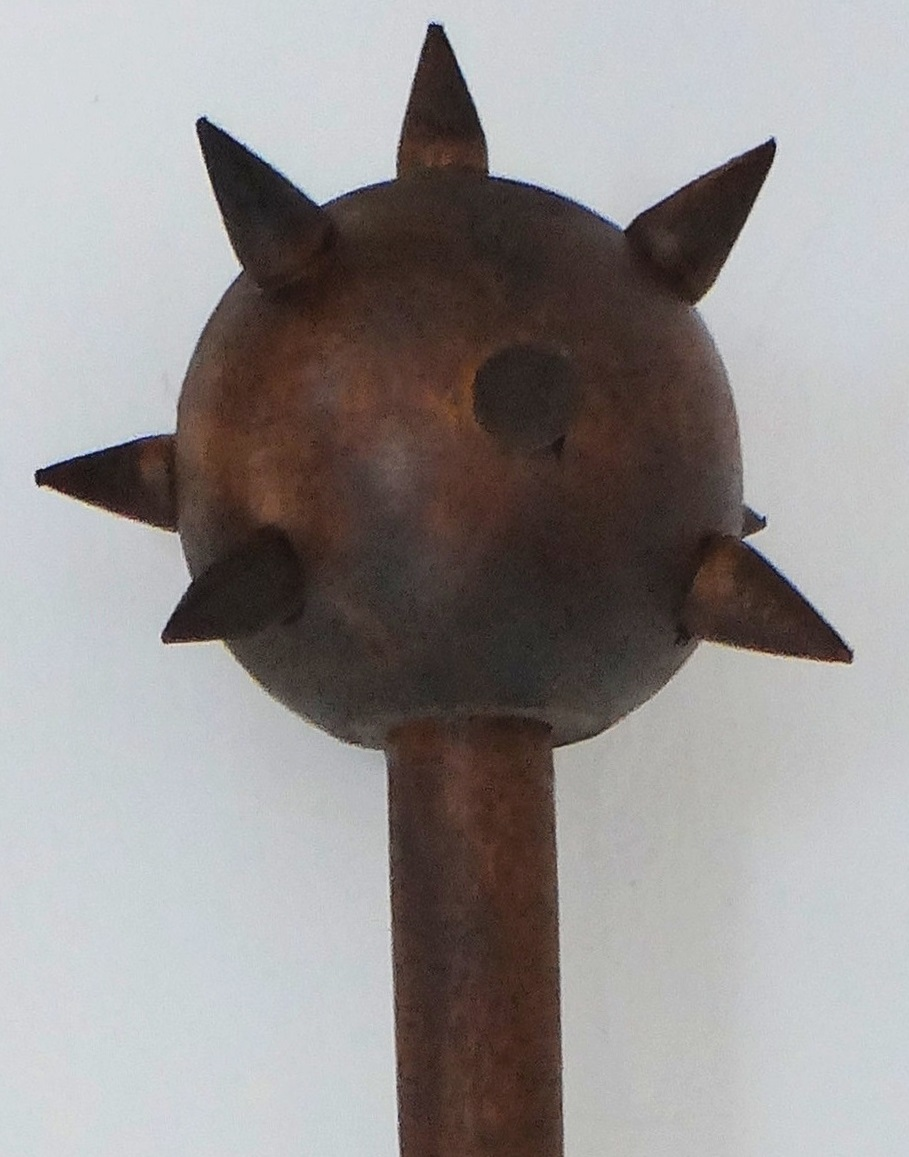
Calcium oxalate monohydrate stones can be spiculated, resembling the head of a morning star.

About 76% of kidney stones are partially or entirely of the calcium oxalate type. They form when urine is persistently saturated with calcium and oxalate. Between 1% and 15% of people globally are affected by kidney stones at some point. In 2015, they caused about 16,000 deaths worldwide.

Some of the oxalate in urine is produced by the body. Calcium and oxalate in the diet play a part but are not the only factors that affect the formation of calcium oxalate stones. Dietary oxalate is an organic ion found in many vegetables, fruits, and nuts. Calcium from bone may also play a role in kidney stone formation.

== Industrial applications ==
Calcium oxalate is used in the manufacture of ceramic glazes.

== See also ==
- Magnesium oxalate
- Oxalic acid
- Sodium oxalate
