= Praseodymium(III) oxalate =

Names
- Other names Praseodymium oxalate, Tris(oxalato(2-))dipraseodymium

Identifiers
CAS Number	3269-10-1
3D model (JSmol)	Interactive image
ChemSpider	144738
ECHA InfoCard	100.019.895
EC Number	221-884-6
PubChem CID	165096
CompTox Dashboard (EPA)	DTXSID20954374
- InChI: InChI=1S/3C2H2O4.2Pr/c3*3-1(4)2(5)6;;/h3*(H,3,4)(H,5,6);;/q;;;2*+3/p-6 Key: UHTYDNCIXKPJDA-UHFFFAOYSA-H
- SMILES: C(=O)(C(=O)[O-])[O-].C(=O)(C(=O)[O-])[O-].C(=O)(C(=O)[O-])[O-].[Pr+3].[Pr+3]

Properties
Chemical formula	Pr_{2}(C_{2}O_{4})_{3}
Molar mass	545.87
Appearance	Light green crystals

Hazards
- GHS labelling
Pictograms	(GHS07: Exclamation mark)
Signal word	Warning
Hazard statements	H302, H312
Precautionary statements	P264, P270, P280, P301+P312, P302+P352, P312, P322, P330, P363, P501

Related compounds
Other cations	Cerium(III) oxalate; Europium(III) oxalate; Gadolinium(III) oxalate; Holmium(III) oxalate; Lanthanum(III) oxalate; Neodymium(III) oxalate; Promethium(III) oxalate; Samarium(III) oxalate; Terbium(III) oxalate; Thulium(III) oxalate; Ytterbium(III) oxalate
- Except where otherwise noted, data are given for materials in their standard state (at 25 °C [77 °F], 100 kPa). Infobox references

Praseodymium(III) oxalate is an inorganic compound, a salt of praseodymium metal and oxalic acid, with the chemical formula Pr(C_{2}O_{4})_{3}. The compound forms light green crystals that are insoluble in water. It also forms crystalline hydrates.

== Preparation ==
Praseodymium(III) oxalate precipitates out during the reaction of soluble praseodymium salts with oxalic acid:

2 Pr(NO_{3})_{3} + 3(COOH)_{2} → Pr_{2}(C_{2}O_{4})_{3} + 6 HNO_{3}

== Properties ==
Praseodymium(III) oxalate forms crystalline hydrates (light green crystals): Pr_{2}(C_{2}O_{4})_{3}·(_{8}H_{2}O + 2.21H_{2}O). The crystalline hydrate decomposes stepwise when heated to 800 °C (1,470 °F):

Pr_{2}(C_{2}O_{4})_{3}·8H_{2}O → Pr_{2}(C_{2}O_{4})_{3} + 10.21 H_{2}O @ (49.5 °C (121.1 °F))
Pr_{2}(C_{2}O_{4})_{3} → Pr_{2}CO_{5} + 2 CO_{2} + 3 CO @ (440.4 °C (824.7 °F))
Pr_{2}CO_{5} → Pr_{2}O_{2}CO_{3} → Pr_{6}O_{11} + 2 CO_{2} @ (650–800 °C (1,202–1,472 °F))

== Uses ==
Praseodymium(III) oxalate is used as an intermediate product in the synthesis of praseodymium. It is also applied to colour some glasses and enamels. If fused with certain other materials, the compound colors glass an intense yellow.
