= Magnesium oxalate =

Magnesium compound

Names
- IUPAC name magnesium oxalate
- Systematic IUPAC name magnesium oxalate
- Other names: magnesium ethanedioate; ethanedioic acid, magnesium salt (1:1); (Dihydrate); magnesium oxalate-2-hydrate; magnesium oxalate dihydrate; oxalic acid magnesium salt dihydrate

Identifiers
CAS Number	547-66-0; 6150-88-5 (dihydrate)
3D model (JSmol)	Interactive image
ChemSpider	61648
ECHA InfoCard	100.008.121
EC Number	208-932-1
PubChem CID	68353
UNII	620U3O59Z6; D674BHV95V (dihydrate)
UN number	2811
CompTox Dashboard (EPA)	DTXSID0060276
- InChI: InChI=; 1S/C2H2O4.Mg/c3-1(4)2(5)6;/h(H,3,4)(H,5,6);/q;+2/p-2; 1S/C2H2O4.Mg.2H2O/c3-1(4)2(5)6;;;/h(H,3,4)(H,5,6);;2*1H2/q;+2;;/p-2 (Dihydrate)
- SMILES: C(=O)(C(=O)[O-])[O-].[Mg+2]

Properties
Chemical formula	MgC_{2}O_{4}; MgC_{2}O_{4}•2H_{2}O (Dihydrate)
Molar mass	112.324 g/mol; 148.354 g/mol (Dihydrate)
Appearance	white solid
Density	2.45 g/cm^{3}
Melting point	between 420 and 620 °C (788 and 1,148 °F; 693 and 893 K); 150 °C (302 °F; 423 K) (dihydrate) both decompose
Solubility in water	0.038g/100g H_{2}O (anhydrous and dihydrate)
Solubility product (K_{sp})	8.5 × 10^{−5} for MgC_{2}O_{4}
Solubility	insoluble in organics
Vapor pressure	2.51×10^{−6} mmHg

Thermochemistry
Std enthalpy of formation (Δ_{f}H^{⦵}_{298})	-1269.0 kJ mol^{−1}

Hazards
- Occupational safety and health (OHS/OSH)
Main hazards	Irritant
NFPA 704 (fire diamond)	1 0 0
Flash point	Not Applicable
Autoignition temperature	Not Applicable

Related compounds
Related compounds	Magnesium Oxide
- Except where otherwise noted, data are given for materials in their standard state (at 25 °C [77 °F], 100 kPa). Infobox references

Magnesium oxalate is an organic compound comprising a magnesium cation with a 2+ charge bonded to an oxalate anion. It has the chemical formula MgC_{2}O_{4}. Magnesium oxalate is a white solid that comes in two forms: an anhydrous form and a dihydrate form where two water molecules are complexed with the structure. Both forms are practically insoluble in water and are insoluble in organic solutions.

== Natural occurrence ==
Magnesium oxalate has been found naturally near Mill of Johnston, which is located close to Insch in northeast Scotland. This naturally occurring magnesium oxalate is called glushinskite and occurs at the lichen/rock interface on serpentinite as a creamy white layer mixed in with the hyphae of the lichen fungus. A scanning electron micrograph of samples taken showed that the crystals had a pyramidal structure with both curved and striated faces. The size of these crystals ranged from 2 to 5 μm.

== Synthesis and reactions ==
Magnesium oxalate can by synthesized by combining a magnesium salt or ion with an oxalate.

Mg^{2+} + C_{2}O_{4}^{2−} → MgC_{2}O_{4}

A specific example of a synthesis would be mixing Mg(NO_{3})_{2} and KOH and then adding that solution to dimethyl oxalate, (COOCH_{3})_{2}.

When heated, magnesium oxalate will decompose. First, the dihydrate will decompose at 150 °C into the anhydrous form.

MgC_{2}O_{4}•2H_{2}O → MgC_{2}O_{4} + 2 H_{2}O

With additional heating the anhydrous form will decompose further into magnesium oxide and carbon oxides between 420 °C and 620 °C. First, carbon monoxide and magnesium carbonate form. The carbon monoxide then oxidizes to carbon dioxide, and the magnesium carbonate decomposes further to magnesium oxide and carbon dioxide.

MgC_{2}O_{4} → MgCO_{3} + CO
CO + 1/2 O_{2} → CO_{2}
MgCO_{3} → MgO + CO_{2}

Magnesium oxalate dihydrate has also been used in the synthesis of nano sized particles of magnesium oxide, which have larger surface-area-to-volume ratio than conventionally synthesized particles and are optimal for various applications, such as in catalysis. By using a sol-gel synthesis, which involves combining a magnesium salt, in this case magnesium oxalate, with a gelating agent, nano sized particles of magnesium oxide can be produced.

== Health and safety ==
Magnesium oxalate is a skin and eye irritant. If inhaled, it will irritate the lungs and mucous membranes. Magnesium oxalate has no known chronic effects nor any carcinogenic effects. Magnesium oxalate is non-flammable and stable, but in fire conditions it will give off toxic fumes. According to OSHA, magnesium oxalate is considered to be hazardous.

== See also ==
- Calcium oxalate
- Oxalic acid
