= Barium oxalate =

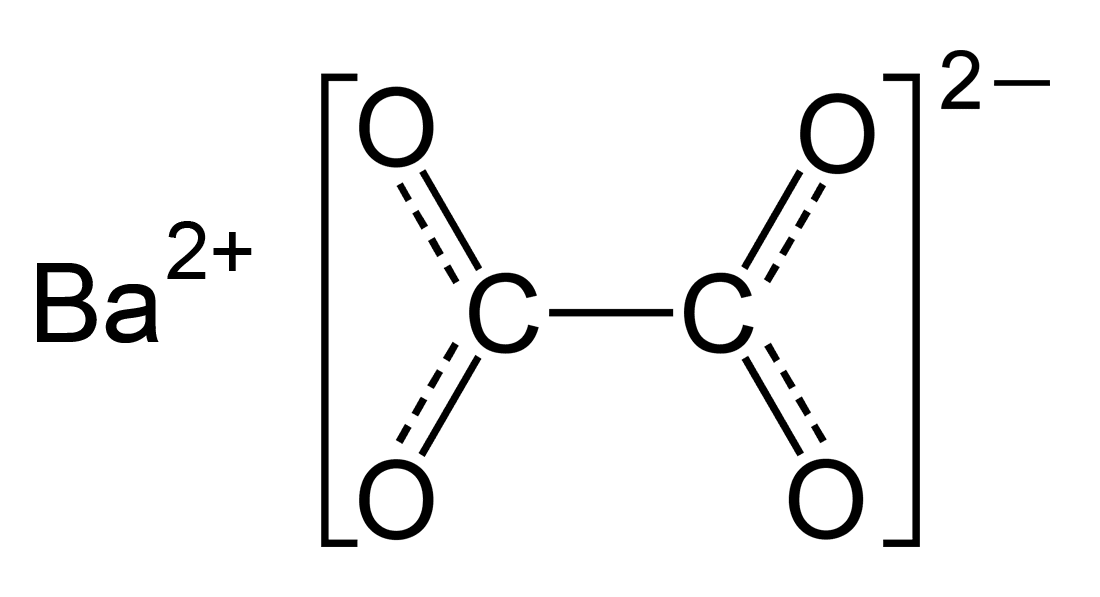

Identifiers
CAS Number	516-02-9
3D model (JSmol)	Interactive image
ChemSpider	61508
ECHA InfoCard	100.007.471
PubChem CID	68201
UNII	54R8VVF8ZK
CompTox Dashboard (EPA)	DTXSID20883418
- InChI: InChI=1S/C2H2O4.Ba/c3-1(4)2(5)6;/h(H,3,4)(H,5,6);/q;+2/p-2 Key: GXUARMXARIJAFV-UHFFFAOYSA-L; InChI=1/C2H2O4.Ba/c3-1(4)2(5)6;/h(H,3,4)(H,5,6);/q;+2/p-2 Key: GXUARMXARIJAFV-NUQVWONBAK
- SMILES: [Ba+2].[O-]C(=O)C([O-])=O

Properties
Chemical formula	BaC_{2}O_{4}
Molar mass	225.345 g·mol^{−1}
Appearance	White powder
Odor	Odorless
Density	2.658 g/cm^{3}
Melting point	400 °C (752 °F; 673 K) (decomposes)
Solubility in water	0.0075 g/100g
- Except where otherwise noted, data are given for materials in their standard state (at 25 °C [77 °F], 100 kPa). verify (what is ?) Infobox references

Barium oxalate is a chemical compound with the chemical formula BaC_{2}O_{4}. It is a barium salt of oxalic acid. It consists of barium cations Ba^{2+} and oxalate anions C_{2}O^{2−}_{4}. It is a white odorless powder that has rarely been used as a colorant in magnesium-containing pyrotechnic formulas.

== Properties ==
It is extremely insoluble in water and converts to barium oxide when heated.

== Preparation ==
The raw materials that are required to prepare barium oxalate are oxalic acid and barium hydroxide (or its octahydrate).

It can be prepared by using an oxalic acid solution and a barium chloride solution, with the reaction as follows:

BaCl_{2} + H_{2}C_{2}O_{4} → BaC_{2}O_{4} + 2 HCl

== Safety ==
Though largely stable, barium oxalate can be reactive with strong acids. A mild skin irritant, the compound is considered toxic when ingested, causing nausea, vomiting, kidney failure, and injury to the gastrointestinal tract.
