= Electrolytic iron =

Electrolytic iron is a form of high purity iron, obtained by electrolysis. It has a high purity greater than 99.95% with trace elements accounting for only a millionth of a decimal.

== Overview ==
To maximise iron's ductility, corrosion resistance, and magnetic characteristics, impurities must be removed by a chemical process. The most effective process is through electrolysis that takes commercial grade iron and minimizes the C, S, Mn, and other trace element levels to become one of the highest grades of iron on the market known as electrolytic iron. Once the iron is in its purest state, it can be then used as a component in alloys. Alloys with high purity elemental makeups have specifically enhanced properties such as ductility, tensile strength, toughness, fatigue strength, heat resistance, and corrosion resistance, on which each element draws from their best inherent properties and collectively contributes to the alloy as a whole.

== Production method of electrolytic iron ==
Smelting is typically classified into two procedures: the wet process and the dry process. Electrolytic iron is considered the “wet process” since electrolysis requires electric charges to move through a liquid solution. This action causes a chemical reaction called electrolytic refining. The result of electrolytic refining is electrolytic iron.

An anode (raw material) and a cathode (base plate) are immersed into an electrolyte including iron ions and other components. Current flows between the anode and the cathode. As a result, iron is deposited on the surface of the cathode due to a difference in an ionization tendency, and high purity iron can be obtained.

Representative value of electrolytic iron
Purity(%)	C(ppm)	P(ppm)	S(ppm)	Si(ppm)	Mn(ppm)	Cu(ppm)	O(ppm)	H(ppm)	N(ppm)
99.99	5～15	1	1～3	<5	1	1	20～50	1～3	<5
99.97	15	7	7	<5	1	2	110	3	8
99.97	15	8	1	<5	1	15	70	-	8
99.97	20	5	8	<5	1	1	100	-	5

== Other methods ==
High purity iron is also produced in dry processes:

- Vacuum oxygen decarburization (VOD) – a process of melting pure iron in a vacuum and degassing
- Electro-slag remelting (ESR) – a process of dripping the molten metal refining pure iron as an electrode.

An ion exchange method is known as wet-type process in addition to electrolytic refining.

== Application ==
Electrolytic iron is utilized by the aerospace sector in areas where components are safety critical. Landing gear, engine shafts in jet aircraft, and gas turbines of generators, are areas that require the use of electrolytic iron. It is also used in research and development, special alloys (maraging steel, Ni-base alloys, Ti alloys), sputtering targets, chemicals (etching liquids), etc. In addition, it is used as a raw material for Japanese swords produced using traditional Japanese techniques.
