= Tetrakis(methylammonium) hexachloroferrate(III) chloride =

Names
- IUPAC name Tetrakis(methylammonium) hexachloroferrate(III) chloride

Identifiers
| CAS Number | 21995-64-2 |
| 3D model (JSmol) | Interactive image |
| ChemSpider | 35763475 |
| PubChem CID | 71308279 |
| CompTox Dashboard (EPA) | DTXSID00745449 |
- InChI: InChI=1S/4CH5N.7ClH.Fe/c4*1-2;;;;;;;;/h4*2H2,1H3;7*1H;/q;;;;;;;;;;;+3/p-3 Key: WWEONMZLNZBJCO-UHFFFAOYSA-K
- SMILES: C[NH3+].C[NH3+].C[NH3+].C[NH3+].[Cl-].Cl[Fe-3](Cl)(Cl)(Cl)(Cl)Cl

Properties
| Chemical formula | C_{4}H_{24}Cl_{7}FeN_{4} |
| Molar mass | 432.26 g·mol^{−1} |
| Appearance | orange crystals |
| Density | 1.58 g cm^{−3} |
| Melting point | 155 °C (311 °F; 428 K) |
- Except where otherwise noted, data are given for materials in their standard state (at 25 °C [77 °F], 100 kPa). verify (what is ?) Infobox references

Tetrakis(methylammonium) hexachloroferrate(III) chloride is a chemical compound with the formula (CH_{3}NH_{3})_{4}[FeCl_{6}]Cl.

== Properties ==
The compound has the form of hygroscopic orange crystals. The hexachloroferrate(III) anion is a coordination complex centred on an iron atom in the +3 oxidation state that is covalently bound to six chloride atoms arranged octahedrally around it. Interstitial chloride anions are each surrounded by four methylammonium cations, with hydrogen bond-like links between the ammonium cations and the ligands of the hexachloroferrate(III) moieties. Each [(CH_{3}NH_{3})_{4}Cl]^{3+} unit balances a [FeCl_{6}]^{3–}, analogous to how hexachloroferrate(III) forms stable compounds with various large triply-cationic atoms and other triply-cationic complexes.

== Synthesis ==
The compound is synthesised by reacting methylammonium chloride, CH_{3}NH_{3}Cl, with anhydrous iron(III) chloride and adding hydrochloric acid with heating. Crystals of the product, which precipitate as the solvent evaporates, are collected and dried using vacuum desiccation.

== Infrared analysis ==
There is a series of bands from 3129 to 2830 cm^{−1} that represent stretching modes of the nitrogen–hydrogen bonds. In addition, a distinct peak is found at 2517 cm^{−1}, whereas the corresponding signal for methylammonium chloride is at 2476 cm^{−1}. The 31 cm^{−1} shift is due to the coordination of an ammonium hydrogen with the hexachloroferrate(III).
