= Electrolytic process =

A video describing the process of electrolytic reduction used in a display at The Children's Museum of Indianapolis within the Treasures of the Earth exhibit. The video describes the electrolytic process as it is occurring on Captain Kidd's Cannon, which is on display and currently undergoing the electrolytic process.

An electrolytic process is the use of electrolysis industrially to refine metals or compounds at a high purity and low cost. Some examples are the Hall-Héroult process used for aluminium, or the production of hydrogen from water.

== Overview ==
Electrolysis is usually done in bulk using hundreds of sheets of metal connected to an electric power source. In the production of copper, these pure sheets of copper are used as starter material for the cathodes, and are then lowered into a solution such as copper sulfate with the large anodes that are cast from impure (97% pure) copper. The copper from the anodes is electroplated on to the cathodes, while any impurities settle to the bottom of the tank. This forms cathodes of 99.999% pure copper.

== See also ==
- Electrolysis of water
- Electroplating
