= Potassium ferrooxalate =

Names
- IUPAC name Potassium iron(II) oxalate
- Other names potassium ferrooxalate potassium bisoxalatoferrate(II)

Identifiers
| CAS Number | 28288-62-2 |
| 3D model (JSmol) | Interactive image |
- InChI: InChI=1S/2C2H2O4.Fe.2K/c2*3-1(4)2(5)6;;;/h2*(H,3,4)(H,5,6);;;/q;;+2;2*+1/p-4 Key: LDRXJDFKHOUYMS-UHFFFAOYSA-J
- SMILES: [K+].[K+].O=C(-C(=O)O1)O[Fe-2]12OC(-C(=O)O2)=O

Properties
| Chemical formula | K_{2}[Fe(C_{2}O_{4})_{2}] (anhydrous); K_{2}[Fe(C_{2}O_{4})_{2}]·2H_{2}O (dihydrate) |
| Molar mass | 310.078 g·mol^{−1} |
| Appearance | orange-yellow solid (anhydrous); golden-yellow crystals (dihydrate) |
| Melting point | 470 °C (878 °F; 743 K) decomposes |

Related compounds
| Related compounds | Iron(II) oxalate; Iron(III) oxalate; Sodium ferrioxalate |
- Except where otherwise noted, data are given for materials in their standard state (at 25 °C [77 °F], 100 kPa). Infobox references

Potassium ferrooxalate, also known as potassium bisoxalatoferrate(II), is a salt with the formula K_{2}[Fe(C_{2}O_{4})_{2}]·xH_{2}O. The anion is a transition metal oxalate complex, consisting of an atom of iron in the +2 oxidation state bound to oxalate (C_{2}O^{2−}_{4}) ligands and water.

Anhydrous K_{2}Fe(C_{2}O_{4})_{2} has been prepared by hydrothermal methods from ferrous chloride. It is a coordination polymer with trigonal prismatic Fe(C_{2}O_{4})_{3} centers. Half of the oxalate ligands are bridging.

== Dihydrate ==
The material K_{2}[Fe(C_{2}O_{4})_{2}]·2H_{2}O has been claimed but not verified. Potassium ferrooxalate is believed to be formed when the related compound potassium ferrioxalate K_{3}[Fe(C_{2}O_{4})_{3}] is decomposed by light in solution (a common method of actinometry) or heated above 296 °C (565 °F). The anhydrous salt is orange-yellow and dissolves in water to give a red solution. Crystals of the dihydrate K_{2}[Fe(C_{2}O_{4})_{2}]·2H_{2}O are golden yellow in color.
