= Transition metal oxalate complex =

Transition metal oxalate complexes are coordination complexes with oxalate (C_{2}O^{2−}_{4}) ligands. Some are useful commercially, but the topic has attracted regular scholarly scrutiny. Oxalate (C_{2}O^{2−}_{4}) is a kind of dicarboxylate ligand. As a small, symmetrical dinegative ion, oxalate commonly forms five-membered MO_{2}C_{2} chelate rings. Mixed ligand complexes are known, such as [Co(C_{2}O_{4})(NH_{3})_{4}]^{κ+}.

Structures of some metal oxalate complexes
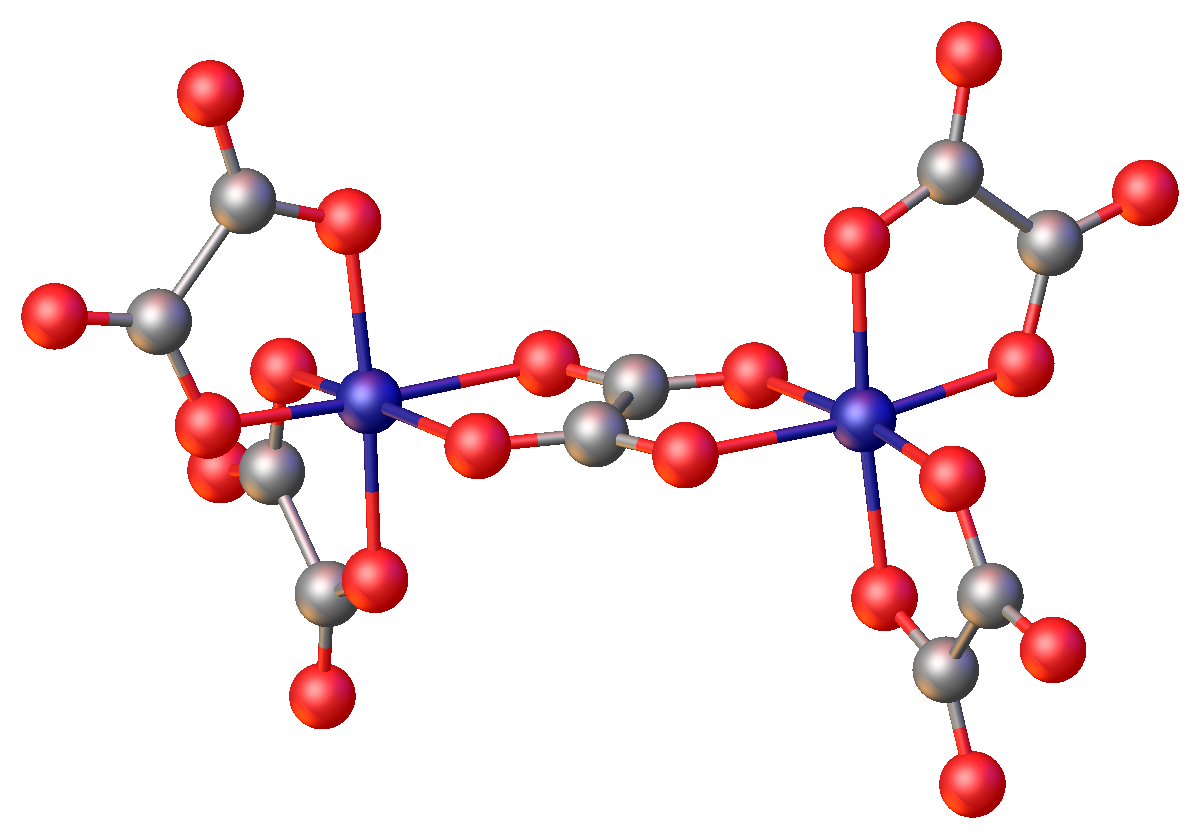
[Cr_{2}(ox)_{5}]^{4−}.

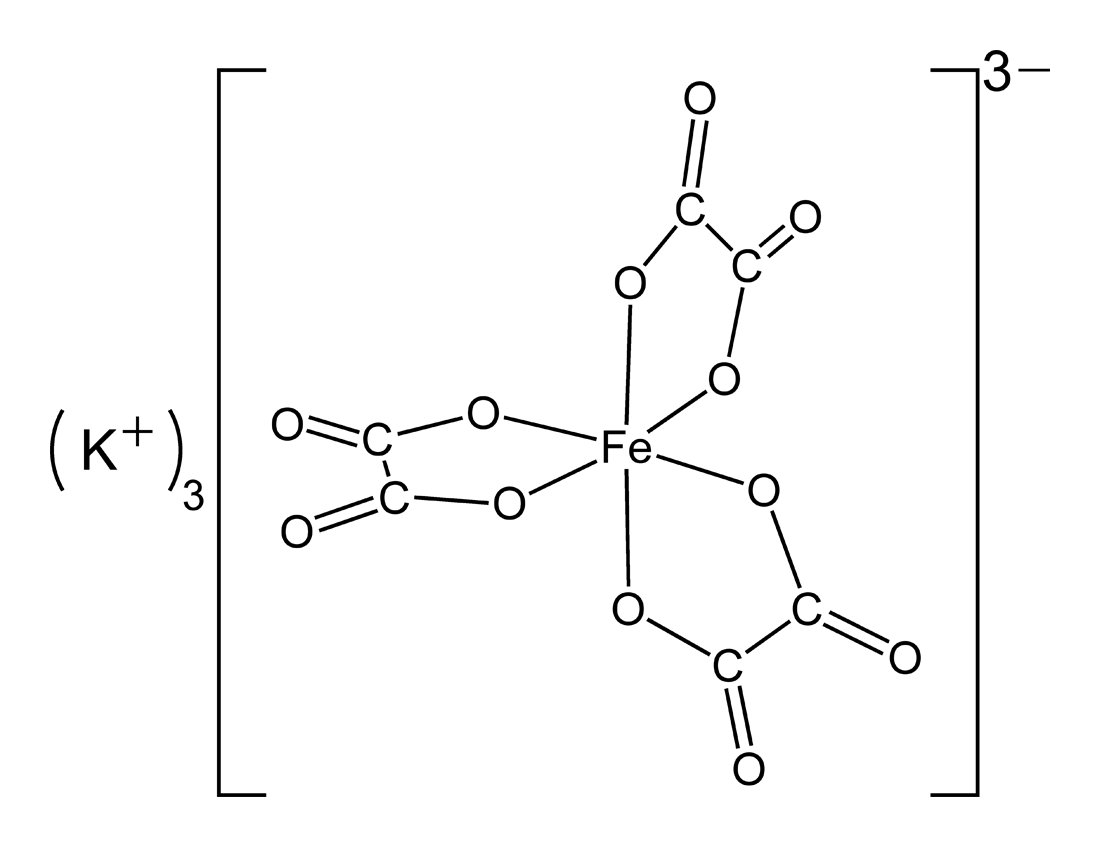
Potassium ferrioxalate (K_{3}[Fe(C_{2}O_{4})_{3}]·3H_{2}O)

Oxaliplatin, an anticancer drug

[Zr(ox)_{4}]^{4−}

== Examples ==
=== Homoleptic complexes ===
Homoleptic oxalato complexes are common, for example, those with the formula [M(κ^{2}-C_{2}O_{4})_{3}]^{n−}: M = V(III), Mn(III), Cr(III), Tc(IV), Fe(III), Ru(III), Co(III), Rh(III), Ir(III). These anions are chiral (D_{3} symmetry), and some have been resolved into their component enantiomers. Some early metals form tetrakis complexes of the type [M(κ^{2}-C_{2}O_{4})_{4}]^{n−} M = Nb(V), Zr(IV), Hf(IV), Ta(V),

The Δ and Λ enantiomorphs of [Fe(C_{2}O_{4})_{3}]^{3−} have been separated.

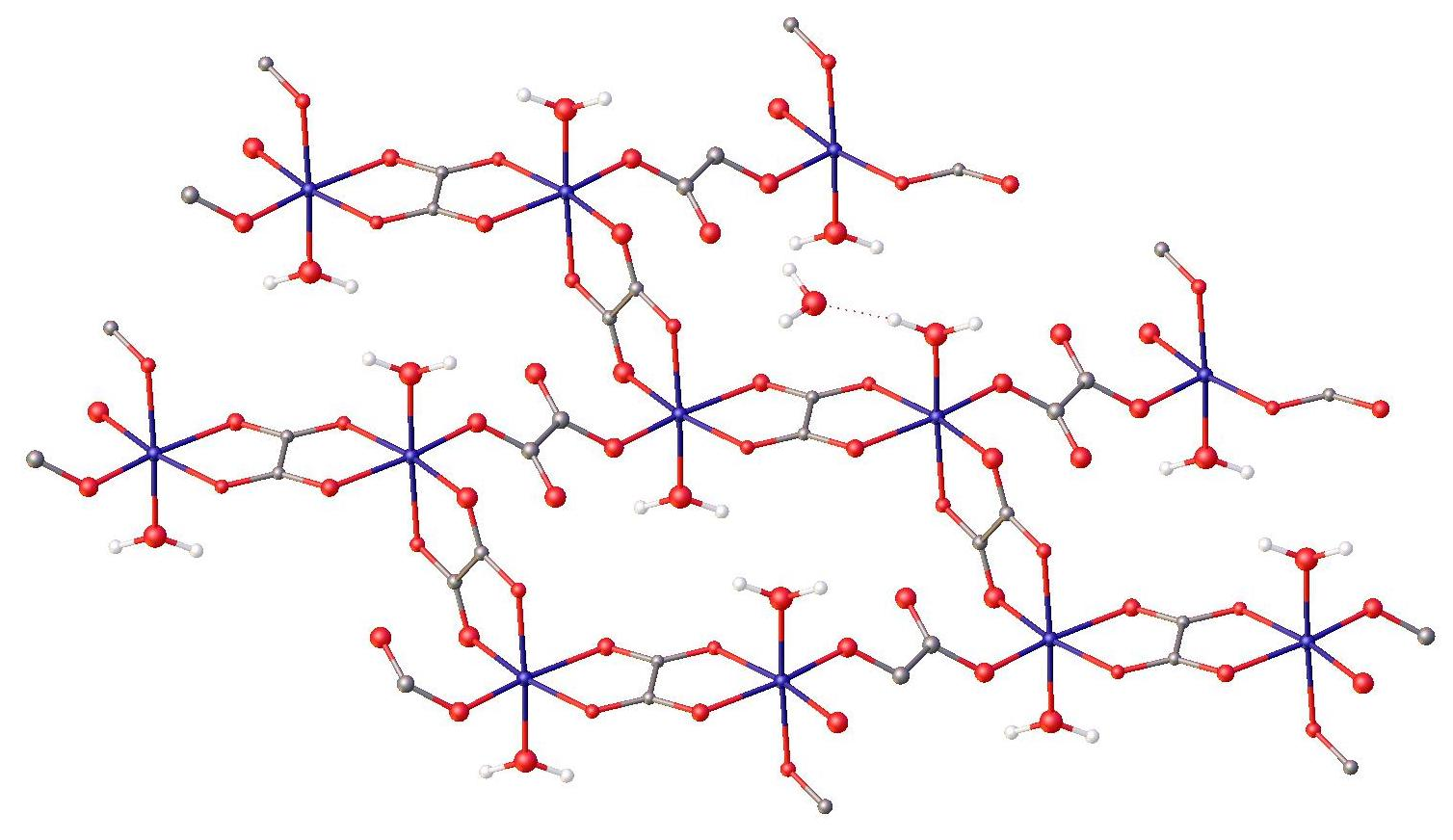
Structure of hydrated ferric oxalate, a coordination polymer. Color code: red = O, white = H, blue = Fe, gray = C.

Oxalate is often a bridging ligand forming bi- and polynuclear complexes with (κ^{2},κ'^{2}-C_{2}O_{4})M_{2} cores. Illustrative binuclear complexes are [M_{2}(C_{2}O_{4})_{5}]^{2−} M = Fe(II) and Cr(III)

=== Mixed ligand complexes ===
Whereas homoleptic complexes are easier to describe, far more abundant are complexes with oxalate and other ligands. Many metals form polynuclear complexes with oxalate and water. In ferric oxalate, Fe_{2}(C_{2}O_{4})_{3}·4H_{2}O, one oxalate is bonded through all four oxygen atoms and another oxalate binds through only two oxygen atoms, in both cases bridging. "Durrant's salt" contains the anionic complex [Co(C_{2}O_{4})_{2}(μ-OH)]^{4−}_{2}.

== Reactions and applications ==
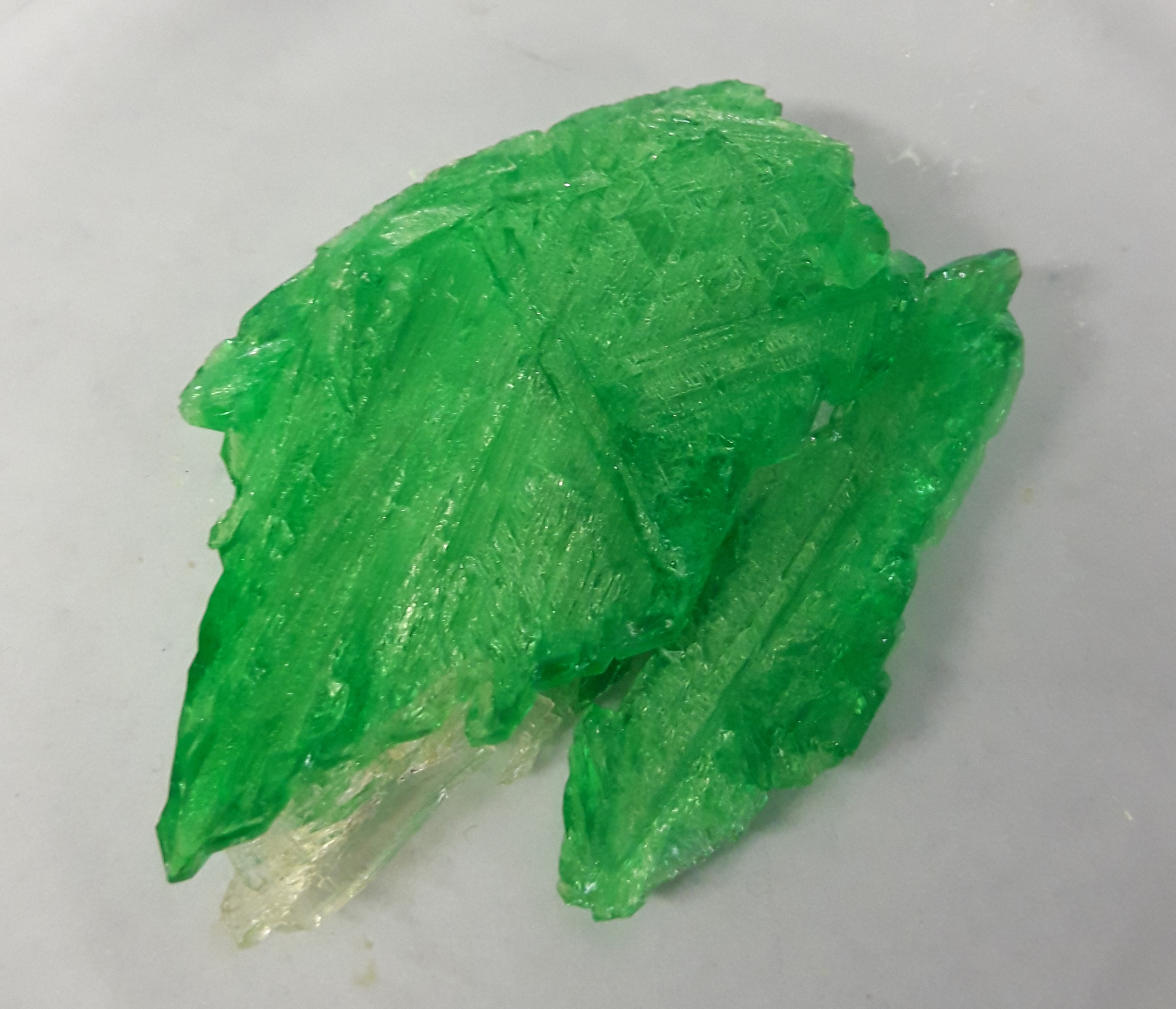
Potassium ferrioxalate crystals.

Metal oxalate complexes are photoactive, degrading with loss of carbon dioxide. This reaction is the basis of the technique called actinometry. Ferrioxalate undergoes photoreduction. The iron centre is reduced (gains an electron) from the +3 to the +2 oxidation state, while an oxalate ion is oxidised to carbon dioxide:

2 [Fe(C_{2}O_{4})_{3}]^{3−} + hν → 2 [Fe(C_{2}O_{4})_{2}]^{2−} + 2 CO_{2} + C_{2}O^{2−}_{4}

The redox reaction has been used to access unusual complexes. Ultraviolet irradiation of Pt(C_{2}O_{4})(PPh_{3})_{2} gives derivatives of Pt^{0}(PPh_{3})_{2}.

Metal oxalates with the stoichiometry 1:1 are often insoluble. This fact provides a way to separate metal ions from solutions, including extract of ores. Combustion of metal oxalates gives metal oxides.

== Natural occurrence ==
The minerals moolooite and antipinite are examples of naturally occurring copper oxalates. They arise from the weathering of other copper ores. A few other oxalate-containing minerals are known.

== See also ==
- Transition metal carboxylate complex
- Oxalatonickelate
