= Iron(II) oxalate =

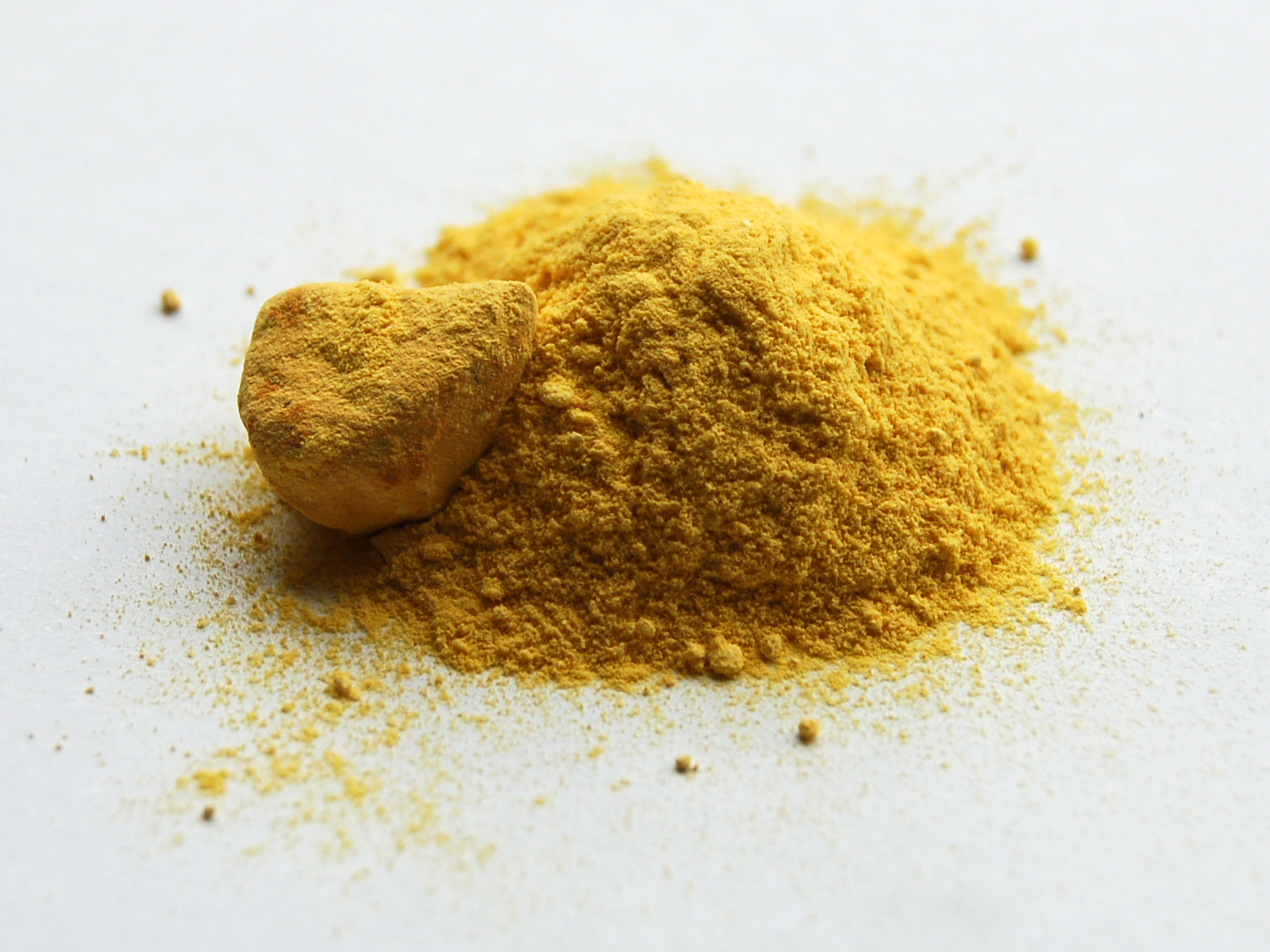

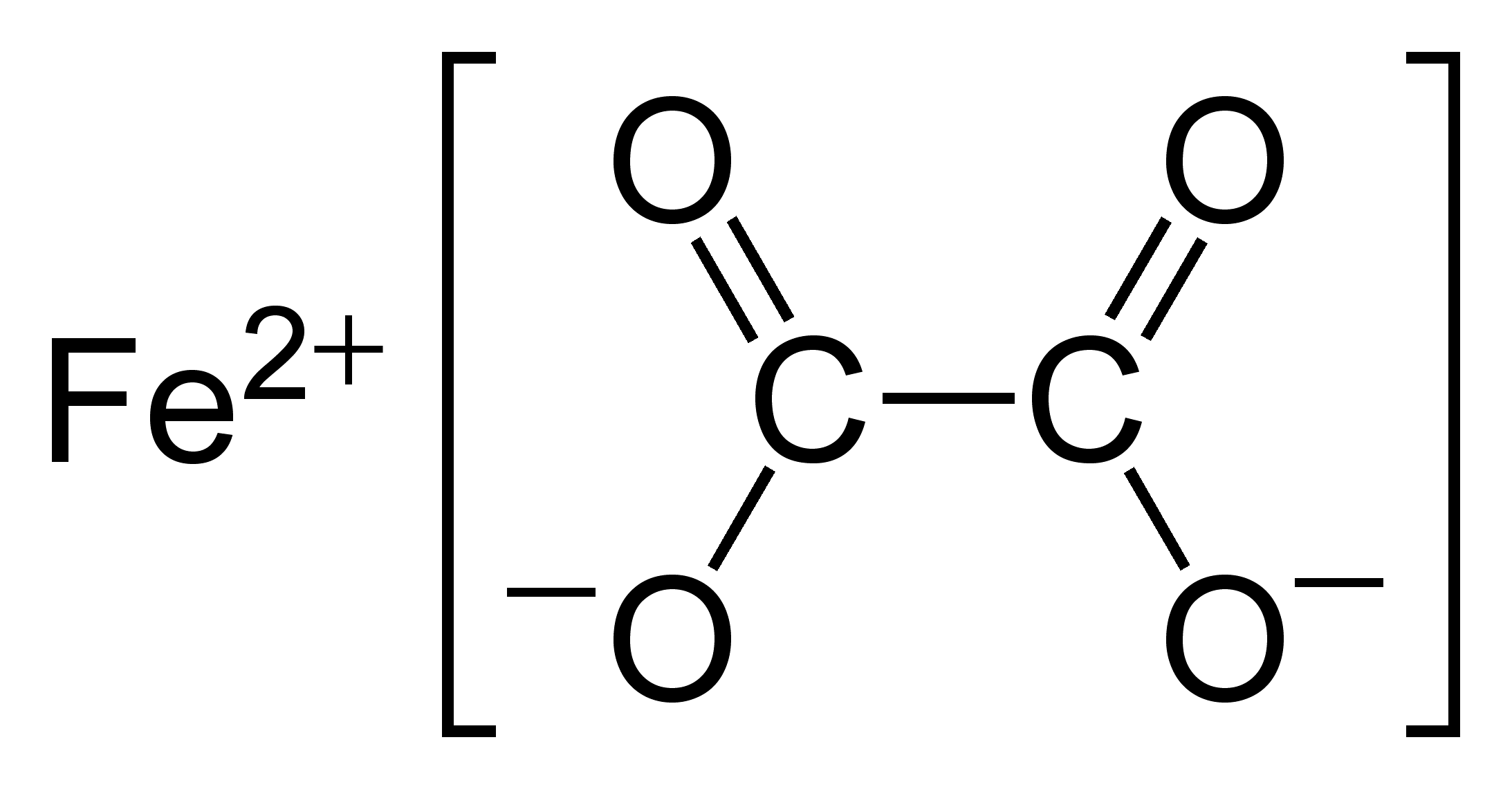

Names
- IUPAC name Iron(II) oxalate
- Systematic IUPAC name Iron, diaqua(ethanedioato(2-)-O,O')- (dihydrate)
- Other names: Iron oxalate; Ferrous oxalate

Identifiers
CAS Number	(anhydrous): 516-03-0; (dihydrate): 6047-25-2
3D model (JSmol)	(anhydrous): Interactive image; (dihydrate): Interactive image
ChemSpider	(anhydrous): 10144; (dihydrate): 450862
ECHA InfoCard	100.007.472
EC Number	(anhydrous): 208-217-4; (dihydrate): 611-981-5
PubChem CID	(anhydrous): 10589; (dihydrate): 516788
UNII	(anhydrous): DZP4YV3ICV; (dihydrate): Z6X3YBU50D
CompTox Dashboard (EPA)	DTXSID4060159; (dihydrate): DTXSID90975879
- InChI: InChI=1S/3C2H2O4.2Fe/c3*3-1(4)2(5)6;;/h3*(H,3,4)(H,5,6);;/q;;;2*+3/p-6 Key: VEPSWGHMGZQCIN-UHFFFAOYSA-H; (dihydrate): InChI=1S/C2H2O4.Fe.2H2O/c3-1(4)2(5)6;;;/h(H,3,4)(H,5,6);;2*1H2/q;+2;;/p-2 Key: NPLZZSLZTJVZSX-UHFFFAOYSA-L
- SMILES: (anhydrous): [Fe+2].O=C([O-])-C([O-])=O; (dihydrate): C(=O)(C(=O)[O-])[O-].O.O.[Fe+2]

Properties
Chemical formula	FeC_{2}O_{4} (anhydrous); FeC_{2}O_{4}·2H_{2}O (dihydrate)
Molar mass	143.86 g⋅mol^{−1} (anhydrous); 179.89 g⋅mol^{−1} (dihydrate)
Appearance	yellow powder
Odor	odorless
Density	2.28 g/cm^{3}
Melting point	~120 °C (248 °F; 393 K) (dihydrate, decomposes to anhydrous); 190 °C (374 °F; 463 K) (anhydrous, decomposes)
Solubility in water	0.097 g/100g (dihydrate)

Hazards
- GHS labelling
Pictograms	(GHS07: Exclamation mark)
Signal word	Warning
Hazard statements	H302+H312
Precautionary statements	P264, P270, P280, P301+P312+P330, P302+P352+P312, P363, P501
NFPA 704 (fire diamond)	2 1 1
Threshold limit value (TLV)	1 mg/m^{3} (TWA)
- NIOSH (US health exposure limits)
PEL (Permissible)	1 mg/m^{3} (TWA, vacated)
REL (Recommended)	1 mg/m^{3} (TWA)
- Except where otherwise noted, data are given for materials in their standard state (at 25 °C [77 °F], 100 kPa). verify (what is ?) Infobox references

Ferrous oxalate (iron(II) oxalate) refers to the inorganic compound with the formula FeC_{2}O_{4} (anhydrous) or FeC_{2}O_{4}·2H_{2}O (dihydrate). These are yellow compounds. Characteristic of metal oxalate complexes, these compounds tend to be polymeric, hence their low solubility in water. The dihydrate is hygroscopic.

== Structure ==
Like other iron oxalates, ferrous oxalates feature octahedral Fe centers. The dihydrate FeC_{2}O_{4}·2H_{2}O is a coordination polymer, consisting of chains of oxalate-bridged ferrous centers, each with two aquo ligands.
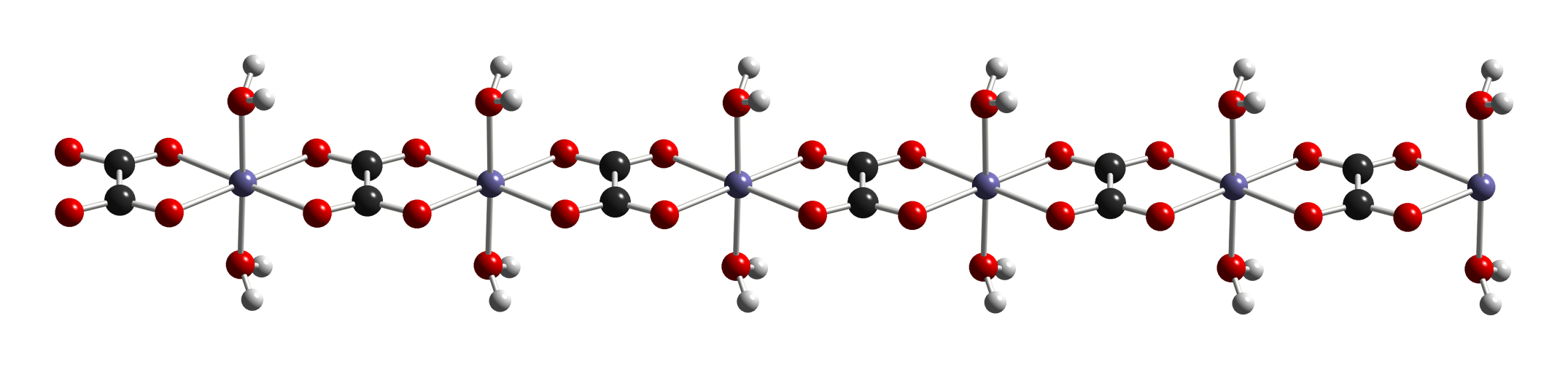

== Reactions ==
When heated to 120 °C (248 °F), the dihydrate dehydrates, and the anhydrous ferrous oxalate decomposes near 190 °C (374 °F). The products of thermal decomposition in a sealed environment are a mixture of iron oxides, pyrophoric iron, carbon dioxide, carbon monoxide, and water.

Ferrous oxalates are precursors to iron phosphates, which are of value in batteries.

== Natural occurrence ==
Anhydrous iron(II) oxalate is unknown among minerals as of 2020. However, the dihydrate is known as humboldtine. A related mineral is stepanovite (Na[Mg(H_{2}O)_{6}][Fe(C_{2}O_{4})_{3}]·3H_{2}O), an unusual example of a naturally occurring ferrioxalate.

== See also ==
- Iron(III) oxalate
- Potassium ferrioxalate
- Sodium ferrioxalate
