= Ferric =

Iron in its +3 oxidation state

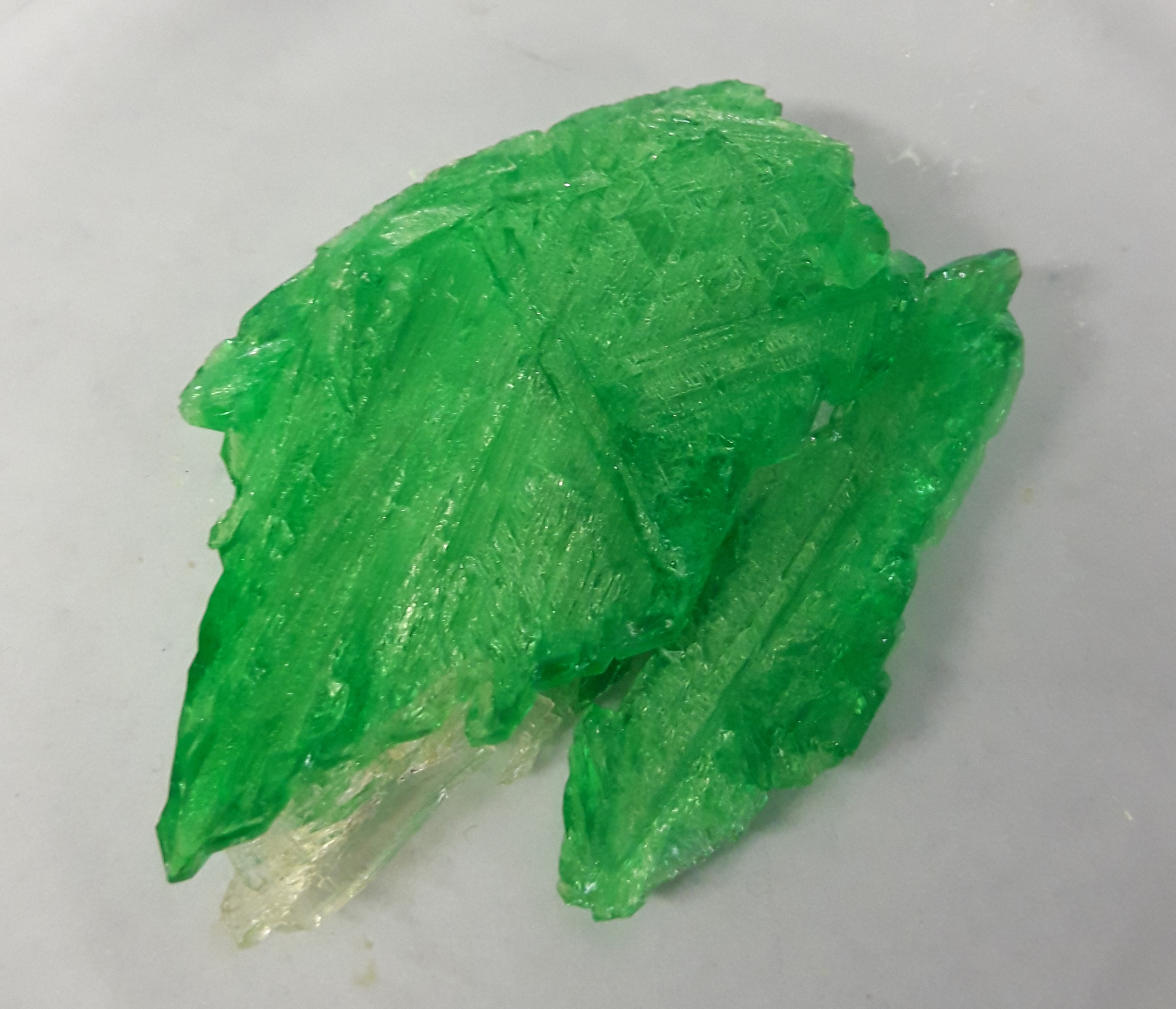
Potassium ferrioxalate contains the iron(III) complex [Fe(C_{2}O_{4})_{3}]^{3−}.

In chemistry, iron(III) or ferric refers to the element iron in its +3 oxidation state. Ferric chloride is an alternative name for iron(III) chloride (FeCl_{3}). The adjective ferrous is used instead for iron(II) salts, containing the cation Fe^{2+}. The word ferric is derived from the Latin word ferrum, meaning "iron".

Although often abbreviated as Fe^{3+}, that naked ion does not exist except under extreme conditions. Iron(III) centres are found in many compounds and coordination complexes, where Fe(III) is bonded to several ligands. A molecular ferric complex is the anion ferrioxalate, [Fe(C_{2}O_{4})_{3}]^{3−}, with three bidentate oxalate ions surrounding the Fe core. Relative to lower oxidation states, ferric is less common in organoiron chemistry, but the ferrocenium cation [Fe(C_{5}H_{5})_{2}]^{+} is well known.

== Iron(III) in biology ==
All known forms of life require iron, which usually exists in Fe(II) or Fe(III) oxidation states. Many proteins in living beings contain iron(III) centers. Examples of such metalloproteins include oxyhemoglobin, ferredoxin, and the cytochromes. Many organisms, from bacteria to humans, store iron as microscopic crystals (3 to 8 nm in diameter) of iron(III) oxide hydroxide, inside a shell of the protein ferritin, from which it can be recovered as needed.

Insufficient iron in the human diet causes anemia. Animals and humans can obtain the necessary iron from foods that contain it in assimilable form, such as meat. Other organisms must obtain their iron from the environment. However, iron tends to form highly insoluble iron(III) oxides/hydroxides in aerobic (oxygenated) environment, especially in calcareous soils. Bacteria and grasses can thrive in such environments by secreting compounds called siderophores that form soluble complexes with iron(III), that can be reabsorbed into the cell. (The other plants instead encourage the growth around their roots of certain bacteria that reduce iron(III) to the more soluble iron(II).)

The insolubility of iron(III) compounds is also responsible for the low levels of iron in seawater, which is often the limiting factor for the growth of the microscopic plants (phytoplankton) that are the basis of the marine food web.

Pourbaix diagram of aqueous iron

== Iron(III) salts and complexes ==
Typically iron(III) salts, like the "chloride" are aquo complexes with the formulas [Fe(H_{2}O)_{5}Cl]^{2+}, [Fe(H_{2}O)_{4}Cl_{2}]^{+}, and [Fe(H_{2}O)_{3}Cl_{3}]. Iron(III) nitrate and iron(III) perchlorate are thought to initially dissolve in water to give [Fe(H_{2}O)_{6}]^{3+} ions. In these complexes, the protons are acidic. Eventually these complexes hydrolyze producing iron(III) hydroxides Fe(OH)_{3} or Fe(O)OH that continue to react, in part via the process called olation. These hydroxides precipitate out of the solution or form colloids. These reactions liberate hydrogen ions H^{+} lowering the pH of its solutions. The equilibria are elaborate:

[Fe(H_{2}O)_{6}]^{3+} ⇌ [Fe(H_{2}O)_{5}OH]^{2+} + H^{+}
2 [Fe(H_{2}O)_{5}OH]^{2+} ⇌ [Fe_{2}(H_{2}O)_{4}(OH)_{2}]^{4+} + 2H_{2}O
2 [Fe(H_{2}O)_{4}(OH)_{2}]^{+} ⇌ [Fe_{2}(H_{2}O)_{8}(OH)_{2}]^{+}_{2} + 2 H_{2}O

The aquo ligands on iron(III) complexes are labile. This behavior is visualized by the color change brought about by reaction with thiocyanate to give a deep red thiocyanate complex.

=== Iron(III) with organic ligands ===
In the presence chelating ligands, the complex hydrolysis reactions are avoided. One of these ligands is EDTA, which is often used to dissolve iron deposits or added to fertilizers to make iron in the soil available (soluble) to plants. Citrate also solubilizes ferric ion at neutral pH, although its complexes are less stable than those of EDTA. Many chelating ligands - the siderophores - are produced naturally to dissolve iron(III) oxides.

Iron(III) complexes with 1,10-phenanthrolinebipyridine is soluble and can sustain reduction to it iron(II) derivative:

Redox reaction of [Fe(bipyridine)_{3}]^{3+}.

== Iron(III) minerals and other solids ==
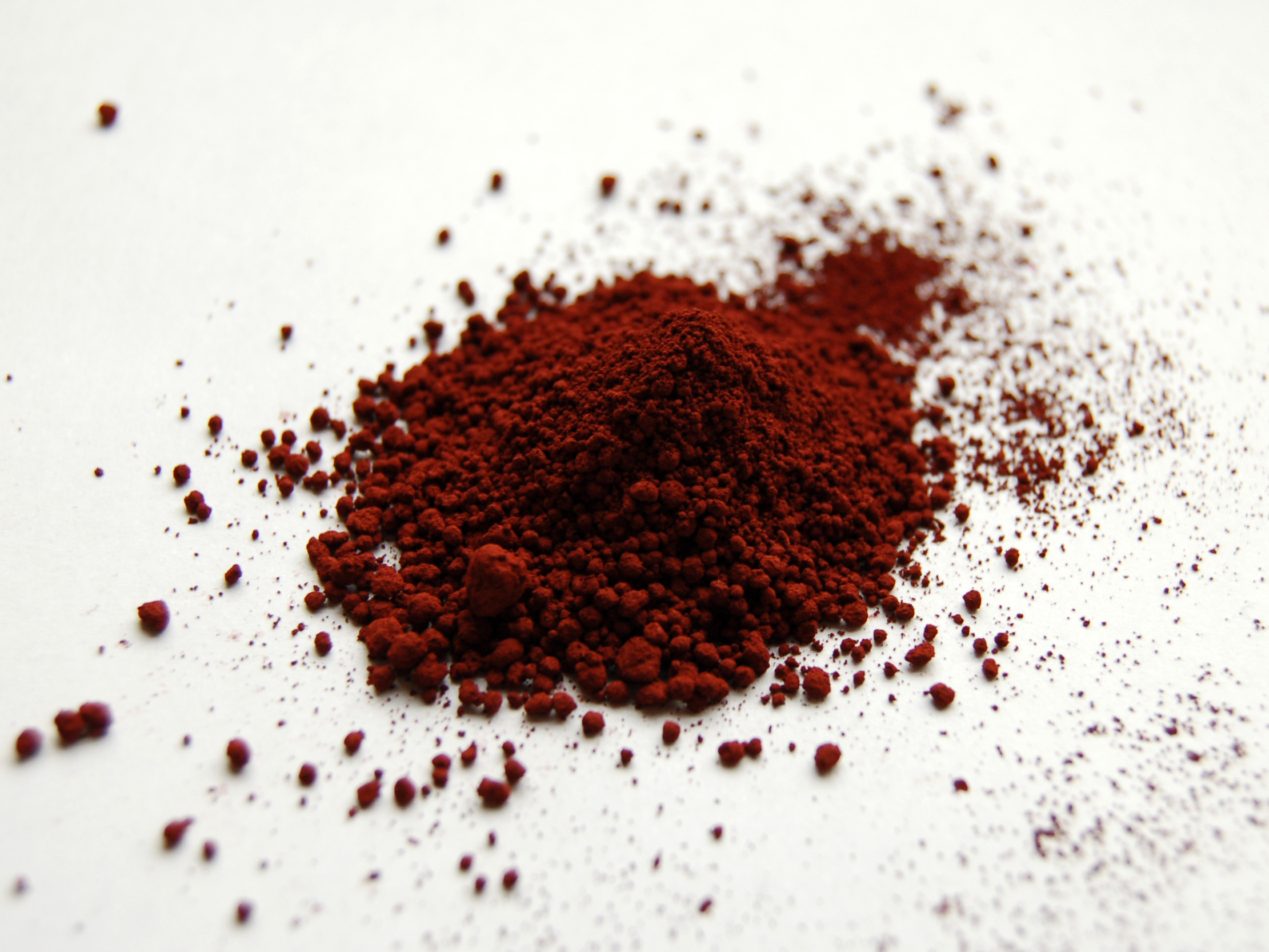
Ferric oxide, commonly called rust, is a very complicated material that contains iron(III).

Iron(III) is found in many minerals and solids, e.g., oxide Fe_{2}O_{3} (hematite) and iron(III) oxide-hydroxide FeO(OH) are extremely insoluble reflecting their polymeric structure. Rust is a mixture of iron(III) oxide and oxide-hydroxide that usually forms when iron metal is exposed to humid air. Unlike the passivating oxide layers that are formed by other metals, like chromium and aluminum, rust flakes off, because it is bulkier than the metal that formed it. Therefore, unprotected iron objects will in time be completely turned into rust.

== Bonding ==
d-orbital splitting scheme for low- and high spin octahedral Fe(III) complex

Iron(III) is a d^{5} center, meaning that the metal has five "valence" electrons in the 3d orbital shell. The number and type of ligands bound to iron(III) determine how these electrons arrange themselves. With so-called "strong field ligands" such as cyanide, the five electrons pair up as best they can. Thus ferricyanide ([Fe(CN)_{6}]^{3−} has only one unpaired electron. It is low-spin. With so-called "weak field ligands" such as water, the five electrons are unpaired. Thus aquo complex ([Fe(H_{2}O)_{6}]^{3+} has only five unpaired electrons. It is high-spin. With chloride, iron(III) forms tetrahedral complexes, e.g. ([Fe(Cl)_{4}]^{−}. Tetrahedral complexes are high spin. The magnetism of ferric complexes can show when they are high or low spin.

== See also ==
- Ferric chloride – Inorganic compound of Iron (Iron(III) chloride)
- Ferric fluoride (Iron(III) fluoride)
- Ferric oxide – Chemical compound (Iron(III) oxide)
- Ferrous – Iron in its +2 oxidation state
