= Iron tetrafluoride =

Names
- Other names: Iron(IV) fluoride; Tetrafluoroiron

Identifiers
| 3D model (JSmol) | Interactive image |
| ChemSpider | 2300385 |
| PubChem CID | 3036341 |
- InChI: InChI=1S/Fe.4FH/h;4*1H/q+4;;;;/p-4 Key: MCPUNIYHLROXJC-UHFFFAOYSA-J
- SMILES: F[Fe](F)(F)F

Properties
| Chemical formula | FeF_{4} |
| Molar mass | 131.837 g/mol |
- Except where otherwise noted, data are given for materials in their standard state (at 25 °C [77 °F], 100 kPa). Infobox references

Iron tetrafluoride is a binary inorganic compound with the chemical formula FeF_{4}. It was initially observed in 2003 via mass spectrometry and Fourier-transform infrared spectroscopy. Iron tetrafluoride is assumed to have tetrahedral or square planar structure. It has been calculated to be stable in the gas phase.

Iron tetrafluoride can be prepared by reaction of iron with fluorine in excess neon and argon at 4 K:

Fe + 2F_{2} → FeF_{4}
