= Potassium ferrioxalate =

Chemical compound

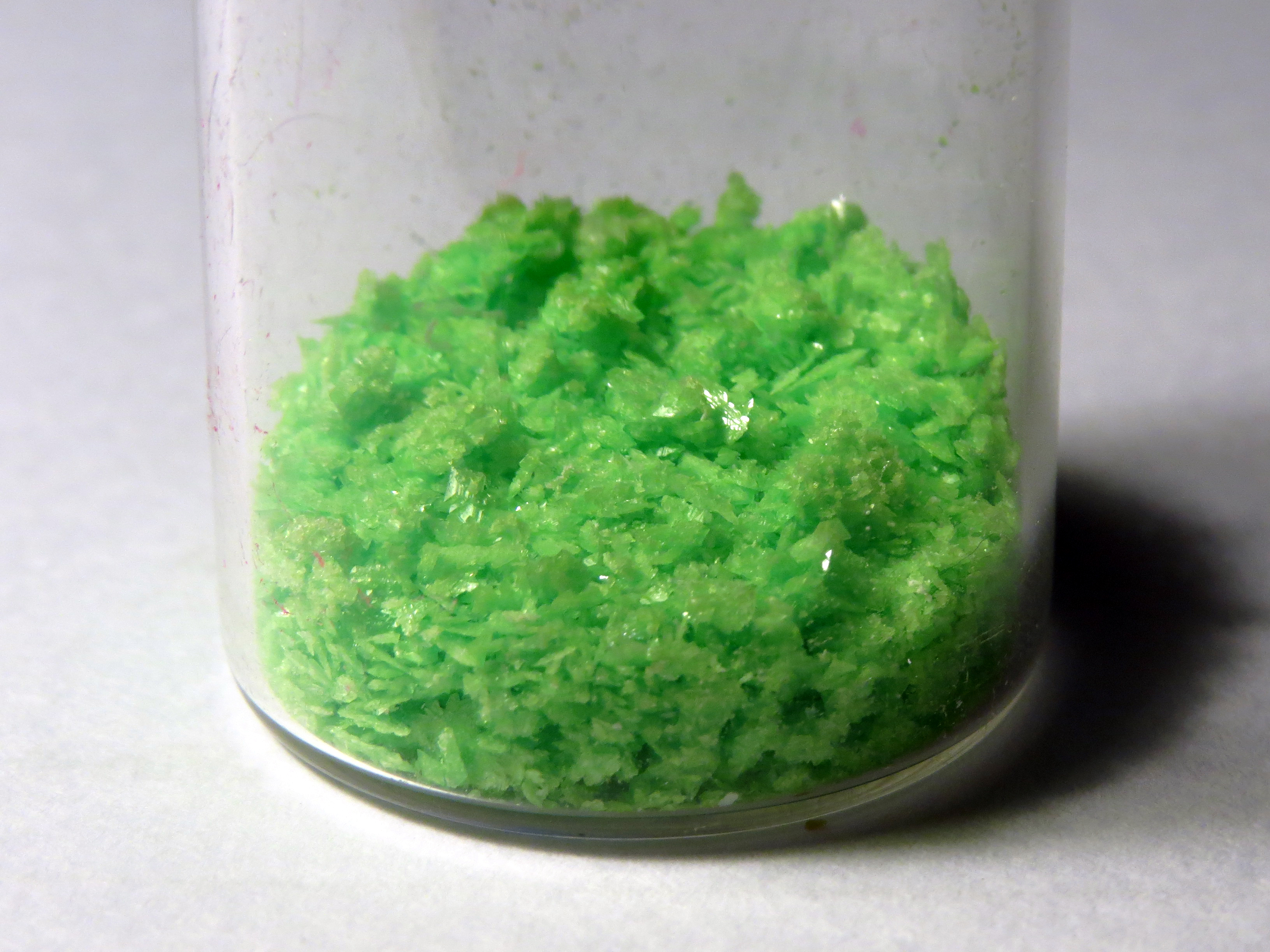
- Lime green crystals of potassium ferrioxalate trihydrate

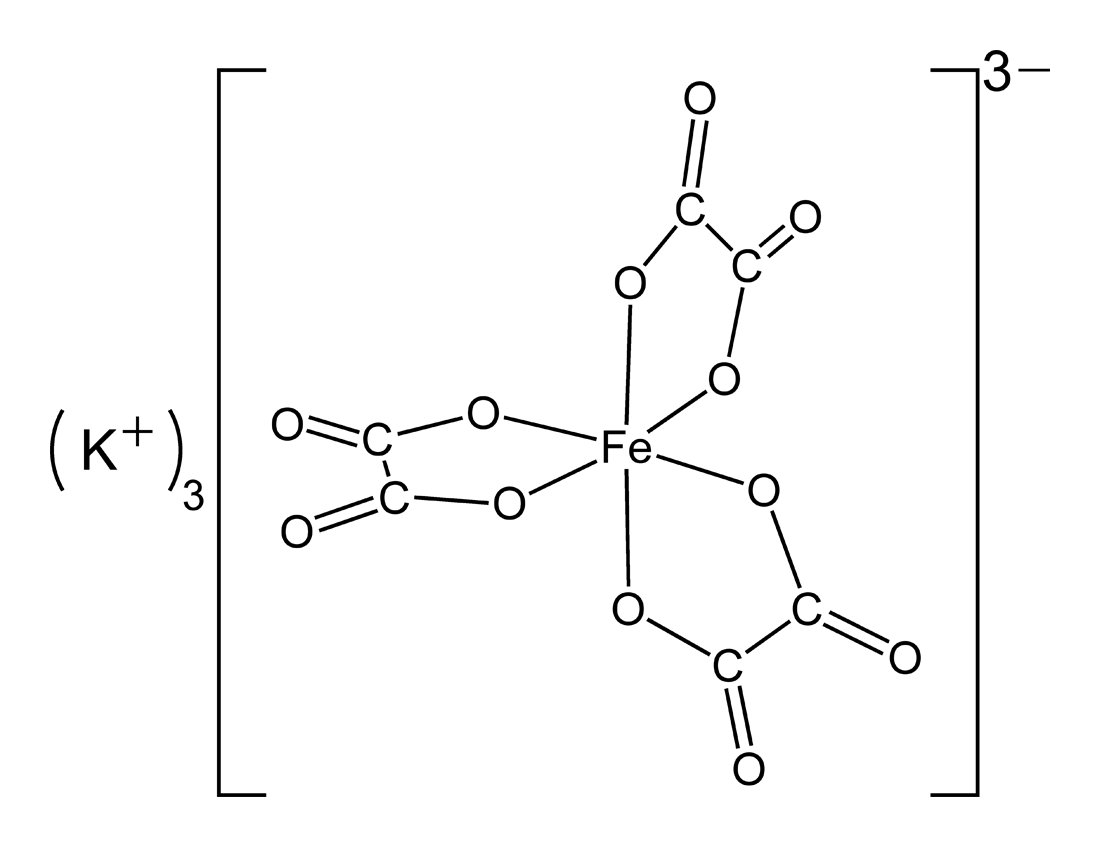
- Potassium ferrioxalate

Names
- IUPAC name Potassium iron(III) oxalate
- Other names potassium ferrioxalate potassium trisoxalatoferrate(III)

Identifiers
CAS Number	14883-34-2; 5936-11-8 (trihydrate)
3D model (JSmol)	Interactive image
ChemSpider	8108406
ECHA InfoCard	100.035.398
EC Number	238-954-7
PubChem CID	24180941
RTECS number	SZ3500000
UNII	BV5XLR9R4O
UN number	3077
CompTox Dashboard (EPA)	DTXSID201045914
- InChI: InChI=1S/3C2H2O4.Fe.K/c3*3-1(4)2(5)6;;/h3*(H,3,4)(H,5,6);;/q;;;+3;+1/p-2 Key: VSRUWRBJHJVUDC-UHFFFAOYSA-L
- SMILES: O=C(C(=O)[O-]1)[O-][Fe+3]123([O-]C(C(=O)[O-]2)=O)[O-]C(C(=O)[O-]3)=O.[K+].[K+].[K+]

Properties
Chemical formula	K_{3}[Fe(C_{2}O_{4})_{3}] (anhydrous); K_{3}[Fe(C_{2}O_{4})_{3}]·3H_{2}O (trihydrate)
Molar mass	437.20 g/mol (anhydrous); 491.25 g/mol (trihydrate)
Appearance	emerald green crystals
Density	2.13 g/cm^{3}
Melting point	230 °C (446 °F; 503 K) the trihydrate loses 3H_{2}O at 113 °C

Structure
Coordination geometry	octahedral
Dipole moment	0 D

Hazards
- Occupational safety and health (OHS/OSH)
Main hazards	Corrosive. Eye, respiratory and skin irritant.
- GHS labelling
Pictograms	(GHS07: Exclamation mark)
Signal word	Warning
Hazard statements	H302, H312
Precautionary statements	P264, P270, P280, P301+P312+P330, P302+P352+P312, P363, P501

Related compounds
Other anions	Sodium ferrioxalate
Related compounds	Iron(II) oxalate Iron(III) oxalate
- Except where otherwise noted, data are given for materials in their standard state (at 25 °C [77 °F], 100 kPa). verify (what is ?) Infobox references

Potassium ferrioxalate, also called potassium trisoxalatoferrate or potassium tris(oxalato)ferrate(III) is a chemical compound with the formula K_{3}[Fe(C_{2}O_{4})_{3}]. It often occurs as the trihydrate K_{3}[Fe(C_{2}O_{4})_{3}]·3H_{2}O. Both are lime green crystalline compounds.

The compound is a salt consisting of ferrioxalate anions, [Fe(C_{2}O_{4})_{3}]^{3−}, and potassium cations K^{+}. The anion is a transition metal oxalate complex consisting of an iron atom in the +3 oxidation state and three bidentate oxalate C_{2}O^{2−}_{4} ligands. Potassium is a counterion, balancing the −3 charge of the complex. In solution, the salt dissociates to give the ferrioxalate anion, [Fe(C_{2}O_{4})_{3}]^{3−}, which appears fluorescent green. The salt is available in anhydrous form as well as a trihydrate.

The ferrioxalate anion is quite stable in the dark, but it is decomposed by light and high-energy electromagnetic radiation.

== Structure ==
The structures of the trihydrate and of the anhydrous salt have been extensively studied. The six Fe–O bond distances are all close to 2.0 Å indicating that the complex is high spin; as the low spin complex would display Jahn–Teller distortions. The ammonium and mixed sodium-potassium salts are isomorphous, as are related complexes with Al^{3+}, Cr^{3+}, and V^{3+}.

The ferrioxalate complex displays helical chirality as it can form two non-superimposable geometries. In accordance with the IUPAC convention, the isomer with the left-handed screw axis is assigned the Greek symbol Λ (lambda). Its mirror image with the right-handed screw axis is given the Greek symbol Δ (delta).

== Preparation ==
The compound can be synthesized by the reaction between iron(III) sulfate, barium oxalate and potassium oxalate:

Fe_{2}(SO_{4})_{3} + 3 BaC_{2}O_{4} + 3 K_{2}C_{2}O_{4} → 2 K_{3}[Fe(C_{2}O_{4})_{3}] + 3 BaSO_{4}

As can be read in the reference above, iron(III) sulfate, barium oxalate and potassium oxalate are combined in water and digested for several hours on a steam bath. Oxalate ions from barium oxalate will then replace the sulfate ions in solution, removing them as BaSO_{4} which can then be filtered and the pure material can be crystallized.

== Uses ==
=== Photometry and actinometry ===
The discovery of the efficient photolysis of the ferrioxalate anion was a landmark for chemical photochemistry and actinometry. The potassium salt was found to be over 1000 times more sensitive than uranyl oxalate, the compound previously used for these purposes.

=== Chemistry education ===
The synthesis and thermal decomposition of potassium ferrioxalate is a popular exercise for high school, college or undergraduate university students, since it involves the chemistry of transition metal complexes, visually observable photochemistry, and thermogravimetry.

=== Blueprints ===
Before the ready availability of wide ink-jet and laser printers, large-size engineering drawings were commonly reproduced by the cyanotype method.

That was a simple contact-based photographic process that produced a "negative" white-on-blue copy of the original drawing—a blueprint. The process is based on the photolysis of an iron(III) complex which gets converted into an insoluble iron(II) version in areas of the paper that were exposed to light.

The compound used in cyanotype is mainly ammonium ferric citrate, but potassium ferrioxalate is also used.

== Reactions ==
=== Photoreduction ===
The ferrioxalate anion is sensitive to light and to high-energy electromagnetic radiation, including X-rays and gamma rays. Absorption of a photon causes the decomposition of one oxalate ion to carbon dioxide CO_{2} and reduction of the iron(III) atom to iron(II). This photo-sensitive property is used for chemical actinometry, the measure of luminous flux, and for preparation of blueprints. This light-catalyzed redox reaction once formed the basis of some photographic processes. However due to their insensitivity and ready availability of advanced digital photography, these processes are obsolete.

=== Thermal decomposition ===
The trihydrate loses the three water molecules at 113 °C.

At 296 °C, the anhydrous salt decomposes into the iron(II) complex potassium ferrooxalate, potassium oxalate, and carbon dioxide:

2 K_{3}[Fe(C_{2}O_{4})_{3}] → 2 K_{2}[Fe(C_{2}O_{4})_{2}] + K_{2}C_{2}O_{4} + 2 CO_{2}

== See also ==
- Transition metal oxalate complex
