= Ferrioxalate =

Ion

Identifiers
CAS Number	15321-61-6
3D model (JSmol)	Interactive image
ChemSpider	146351
PubChem CID	167279
- InChI: InChI=1S/3C2H2O4.Fe/c3*3-1(4)2(5)6;/h3*(H,3,4)(H,5,6);/q;;;+3/p-6 Key: FYJLUEWYCIBBGT-UHFFFAOYSA-H
- SMILES: C(=O)(C(=O)[O-])[O-].C(=O)(C(=O)[O-])[O-].C(=O)(C(=O)[O-])[O-].[Fe+3]

Properties
Chemical formula	C_{6}FeO_{12}^{3−}
Molar mass	319.901 g·mol^{−1}
- Except where otherwise noted, data are given for materials in their standard state (at 25 °C [77 °F], 100 kPa). Infobox references

Ferrioxalate or trisoxalatoferrate(III) is a trivalent anion with formula [Fe(C_{2}O_{4})_{3}]^{3−}. It is a transition metal complex consisting of an iron atom in the +3 oxidation state and three bidentate oxalate ions C_{2}O^{2−}_{4} anions acting as ligands.

The ferrioxalate anion gives a lime green color to salts, and in solution it is fluorescent. The anion is sensitive to light and higher-energy electromagnetic radiation, which causes the decomposition of one oxalate to carbon dioxide (CO_{2}) and reduction of the iron(III) atom to iron(II). This property is exploited for actinometry.

The most common and most-studied salt is potassium ferrioxalate, but the sodium, ammonium, and lithium salts have also received some attention.

== Properties ==
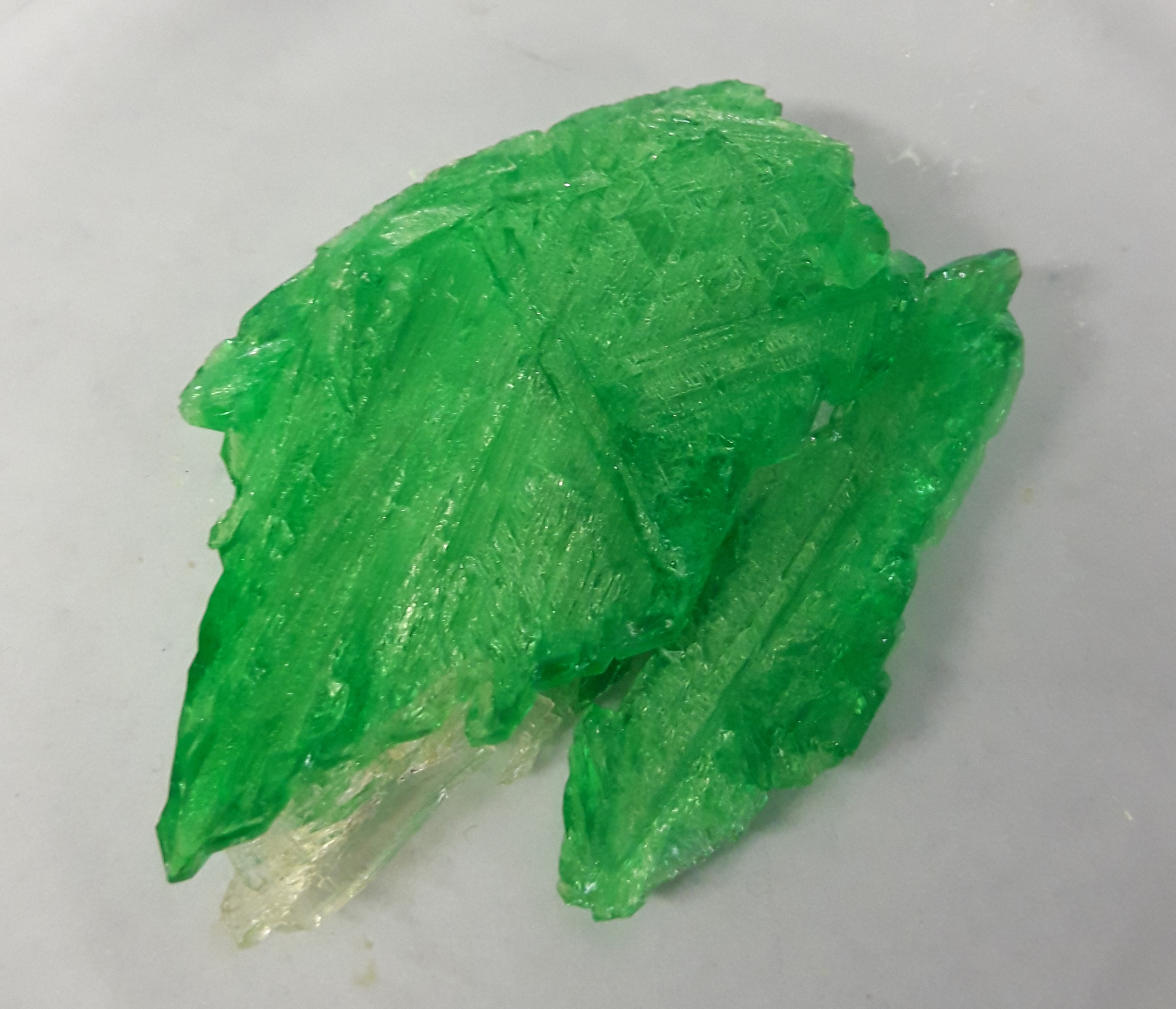
Potassium ferrioxalate crystals.

=== Stability ===
In the absence of light or other radiation, the ferrioxalate complex is quite stable. The potassium and sodium salts and their solutions can be heated to near 100 °C for hours without significant decomposition.

=== Molecular structure ===
The complex is held together by dative covalent bonds, due to the oxygen atoms in the oxalate anions (the "ligands") donating a lone pair to the p and d orbitals of the iron atom (the "center" of the complex). The center has three electrons in its d orbitals, leaving 13 empty places in the remaining d and p orbitals. Twelve of these are filled by electrons from the ligands.

The iron center in the ferrioxalate anion has a distorted octahedral geometry. The ferrioxalate complex has D_{3} molecular symmetry, within which the six Fe–O bond distances all close to 2.0 Å which indicates that the Fe(III) is high spin; as the low spin complex would display Jahn–Teller distortions. The ammonium and mixed sodium-potassium salts are isomorphous, as are related complexes with Al^{3+}, Cr^{3+}, and V^{3+}.

=== Chirality ===
The ferrioxalate complex displays helical chirality as it can form two non-superposable geometries. In accordance with the IUPAC convention, the isomer with the left-handed screw axis is assigned the Greek symbol Λ (lambda). Its mirror image with the right-handed screw axis is given the Greek symbol Δ (delta).

== Reactions ==
=== Photoreduction ===
In solution, the ferrioxalate complex undergoes photoreduction. In this process, the complex absorbs a photon of light and subsequently decomposes to form Fe(C_{2}O_{4})^{2−}_{2} and CO_{2}. The iron centre is reduced (gains an electron) from the +3 to the +2 oxidation state, while an oxalate ion is oxidised to carbon dioxide:

2 [Fe(C_{2}O_{4})_{3}]^{3−} + hν → 2 [Fe(C_{2}O_{4})_{2}]^{2−} + 2 CO_{2} + C_{2}O^{2−}_{4}

This reaction provides an efficient chemical method for photometry and actinometry, the measurement of light and higher-energy electromagnetic radiation. Potassium ferrioxalate is over 1000 times more sensitive than uranyl oxalate, the compound previously used for these purposes. While the complex itself is insensitive to neutrons, the lithium salt can be used to measure them. A lithium-6 nucleus can absorb a neutron and emit alpha particle ^{4}He^{2+} and a triton ^{3}H^{+} with high energies, which presumably decompose the nearby ferrioxalate.

== See also ==
- Sodium ferrioxalate
- Iron(III) oxalate
