= Ferric oxalate =

Names
- Systematic IUPAC name iron(3+) ethanedioate (2:3)
- Other names Iron(III) oxalate

Identifiers
CAS Number	2944-66-3 (Anhydrous); 166897-40-1 (hexahydrate)
3D model (JSmol)	Interactive image
ChemSpider	147789
ECHA InfoCard	100.019.047
EC Number	220-951-7
PubChem CID	168963
UNII	DTJ9P8AB5L
CompTox Dashboard (EPA)	DTXSID10905951
- InChI: InChI=1S/3C2H2O4.2Fe/c3*3-1(4)2(5)6;;/h3*(H,3,4)(H,5,6);;/q;;;2*+3/p-6
- SMILES: [Fe+3].[Fe+3].O=C([O-])C([O-])=O.[O-]C(=O)C([O-])=O.[O-]C(=O)C([O-])=O

Properties
Chemical formula	C_{6}Fe_{2}O_{12}
Molar mass	375.747 g/mol
Appearance	Pale yellow solid (anhydrous); Lime green solid (hexahydrate)
Odor	odorless
Melting point	365.1 °C (689.2 °F)
Solubility in water	slightly soluble

Hazards
- GHS labelling
Pictograms	(GHS07: Exclamation mark)
Signal word	Warning
Hazard statements	H302+H312
Precautionary statements	P264, P270, P280, P301+P317, P302+P352, P317, P321, P330, P362+P364, P501

Related compounds
Related compounds	Iron(II) oxalate; Potassium ferrioxalate; Sodium ferrioxalate
- Except where otherwise noted, data are given for materials in their standard state (at 25 °C [77 °F], 100 kPa). Infobox references

Ferric oxalate, also known as iron(III) oxalate, refers to inorganic compounds with the formula Fe_{2}(C_{2}O_{4})_{3}(H_{2}O)_{x} but could also refer to salts of [Fe(C_{2}O_{4})_{3}]^{3-}. Fe_{2}(C_{2}O_{4})_{3}(H_{2}O)_{x} are coordination polymers with varying degrees of hydration. The coordination complex with the formula [Fe(C_{2}O_{4})_{3}]^{3-} forms a variety of salts, a well-known example being potassium ferrioxalate. This article emphasizes the coordination polymers.

== Structure ==
=== Tetrahydrate ===
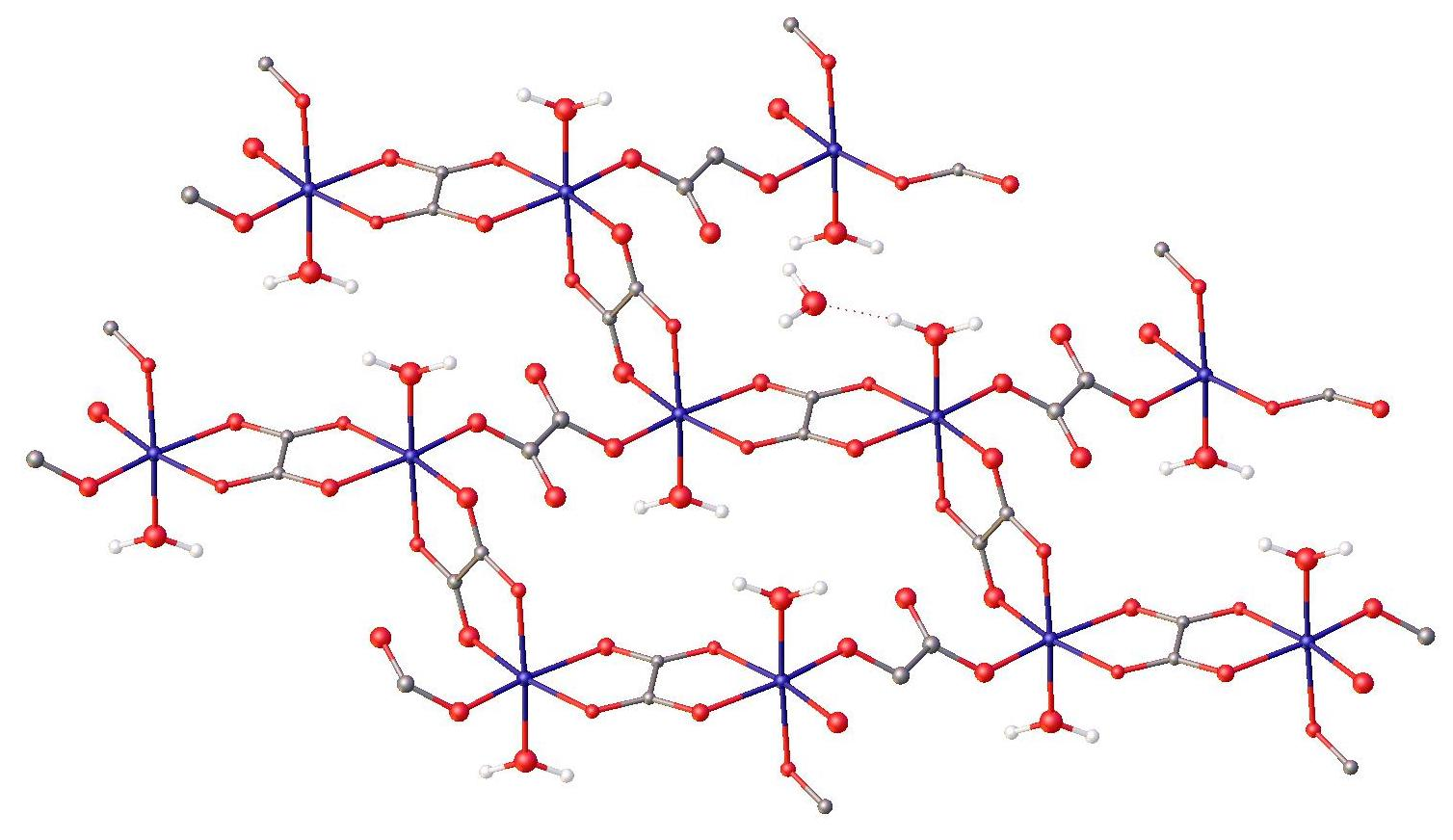
Structure of hydrated ferric oxalate Color code: red=O, white = H, blue = Fe, gray = C.

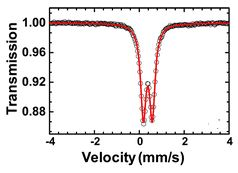
Room temperature Mössbauer spectrum of Fe_{2}(C_{2}O_{4})_{3}·4H_{2}O

According to X-ray crystallography of the tetrahydrate Fe_{2}(C_{2}O_{4})_{3} · 4 H_{2}O, iron is octahedrally coordinated. The oxalate ligands are bridging: some through all four oxygen atoms, some with two oxygen atoms. Half of the water is lattice water, being situated between chains of Fe oxalates.

The Mössbauer spectrum of Fe_{2}(C_{2}O_{4})_{3} · 4 H_{2}O exhibits a doublet with an isomer shift of 0.38 mm/s, and a quadrupole splitting of 0.40 mm/s, suggesting a high spin Fe^{3+} in distorted octahedral coordination.

== Production ==
Ferric oxalate may be produced by reaction of iron(III) hydroxide and solution of oxalic acid:

2Fe(OH)_{3} + 3H_{2}C_{2}O_{4} → Fe_{2}(C_{2}O_{4})_{3} + 6H_{2}O

== Uses ==
=== Dentistry ===
Like many oxalates, ferric oxalate has been investigated as a short-term treatment for dentin hypersensitivity. It is used in certain toothpaste formulations; however, its effectiveness has been questioned.

=== Photography ===
Ferric oxalate is used as the light-sensitive element in the Kallitype photographic printing process; and the platinotype process Platinum/Palladium Printing.

=== Batteries ===
Ferric oxalate tetrahydrate has been investigated as a possible cheap material for the positive electrode (cathode) for lithium-ion batteries. It can intercalate lithium ions at an average potential of 3.35 V, and has shown a sustainable capacity of 98 mAh/g. Additionally, ferric oxalate is one synthetic precursor to lithium iron phosphate, a popular Li-ion battery cathode.

=== Organic synthesis ===
Ferric oxalate hexahydrate is used with sodium borohydride for radical Markovnikov hydrofunctionalization reactions of alkenes.
