= Uranyl oxalate =

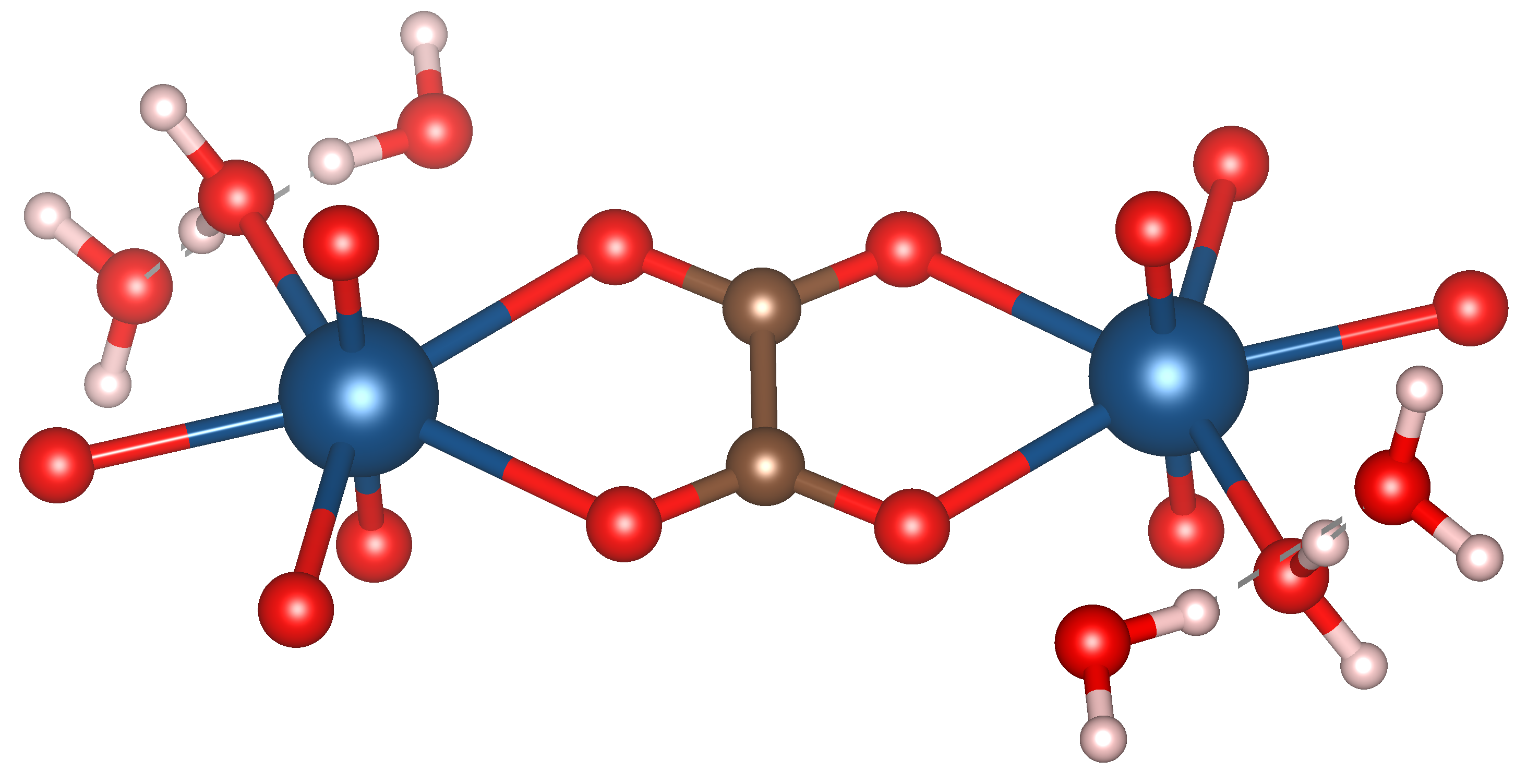

Names
- Other names Uranyl oxalate trihydrate; uranyl oxalate hydrate

Identifiers
CAS Number	2031-89-2
3D model (JSmol)	Interactive image
ChemSpider	11588161
PubChem CID	22717423
CompTox Dashboard (EPA)	DTXSID40942455
- InChI: InChI=1S/C2H2O4.2O.U/c3-1(4)2(5)6;;;/h(H,3,4)(H,5,6);;;/q;;;+2/p-2 Key: PRWGGWFEEGTKSV-UHFFFAOYSA-L
- SMILES: C(=O)(C(=O)[O-])[O-].O=[U+2]=O

Properties
Chemical formula	UO_{2}C_{2}O_{4}
Molar mass	358 g/mole (412 g/mol as trihydrate)
Appearance	Pale yellow powder
Solubility in water	Partially soluble

Related compounds
Related uranium oxides	Uranyl peroxide Triuranium octoxide Uranium dioxide
- Except where otherwise noted, data are given for materials in their standard state (at 25 °C [77 °F], 100 kPa). Infobox references

Uranyl oxalate (UO_{2}C_{2}O_{4}) is a pale yellow powdered uranyl salt. It is often encountered in industrial nuclear processes at both the front and back-end of the nuclear fuel cycle. Due to its hygroscopicity, uranyl oxalate rarely exists in the dehydrated state and is usually instead found in the trihydrate form (UO_{2}C_{2}O_{4}·3H_{2}O) at room temperature. At room temperature, the powder exhibits a monoclinic crystal structure in the P2_{1}/c space group.

== Production ==
Uranyl oxalate trihydrate can be produced by the reaction of uranyl nitrate hexahydrate with oxalic acid.

Uranyl oxalate has been used in actinometers.
