= Sodium ferrioxalate =

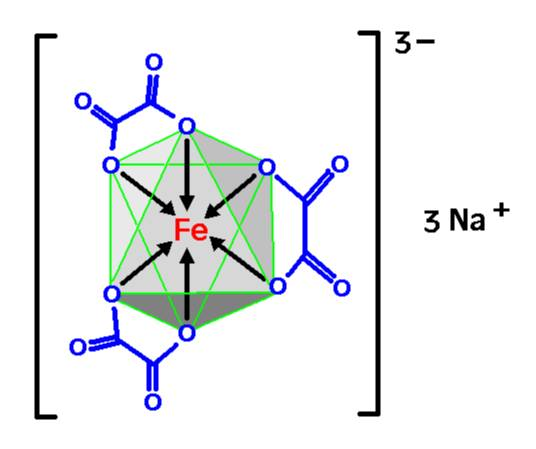
- Sodium ferrioxalate

Names
- IUPAC name: Sodium iron(III) oxalate; Sodium oxalatoferrate; Sodium trisoxalatoferrate
- Other names: Sodium ferrioxalate; Sodium ferric oxalate; Sodium trisoxalatoferrate (III); Sodium oxalatoferrate

Identifiers
CAS Number	5936-14-1; 555-34-0
3D model (JSmol)	Interactive image
ChemSpider	147755
ECHA InfoCard	100.008.267
EC Number	209-092-9
PubChem CID	131855679
CompTox Dashboard (EPA)	DTXSID60890505
- InChI: InChI=1S/3C2H2O4.Fe.3Na/c3*3-1(4)2(5)6;;;;/h3*(H,3,4)(H,5,6);;;;/q;;;+3;3*+1/p-6 Key: XIPRSXSGWQCSHH-UHFFFAOYSA-H
- SMILES: O=C(C(=O)O1)O[Fe-3]123(OC(C(=O)O2)=O)OC(C(=O)O3)=O.[Na+].[Na+].[Na+]

Properties
Chemical formula	C_{6}FeNa_{3}O_{12}
Molar mass	388.868 g·mol^{−1}
Appearance	lime green hydrated crystals
Density	1.97 g/cm^{3} at 17 °C
Solubility in water	32.5pts per 100pts (cold); 182pts per 100pts (boiling)

Structure
Coordination geometry	octahedral
Dipole moment	0 D

Hazards
- Occupational safety and health (OHS/OSH)
Main hazards	Corrosive. Eye, respiratory and skin irritant.
- GHS labelling
Pictograms	(GHS07: Exclamation mark)
Signal word	Warning
Hazard statements	H302, H312
Precautionary statements	P264, P270, P280, P301+P312, P302+P352, P312, P322, P330, P363, P501

Related compounds
Other anions	Potassium ferrioxalate
Related compounds	Iron(II) oxalate; Iron(III) oxalate
- Except where otherwise noted, data are given for materials in their standard state (at 25 °C [77 °F], 100 kPa). verify (what is ?) Infobox references

Sodium ferrioxalate are inorganic compounds with the formula Na_{3}Fe(C_{2}O_{4})_{3}(H_{2}O)_{n}. The pentahydrate has been characterized by X-ray crystallography. In contrast the potassium, ammonium, and rubidium salts crystallize from water as their trihydrates.

The compound is a salt consisting of ferrioxalate anions, [Fe(C_{2}O_{4})_{3}]^{3−}, and sodium cations Na^{+}. The anion is a transition metal complex consisting of an iron atom in the +3 oxidation state and three bidentate oxalate ions C_{2}O^{2−}_{4} anions serving as ligands.

The ferrioxalate anion is sensitive to light and higher-energy electromagnetic radiation, which causes the decomposition of one oxalate to carbon dioxide CO_{2} and reduction of the iron(III) atom to iron(II).

== Preparation ==
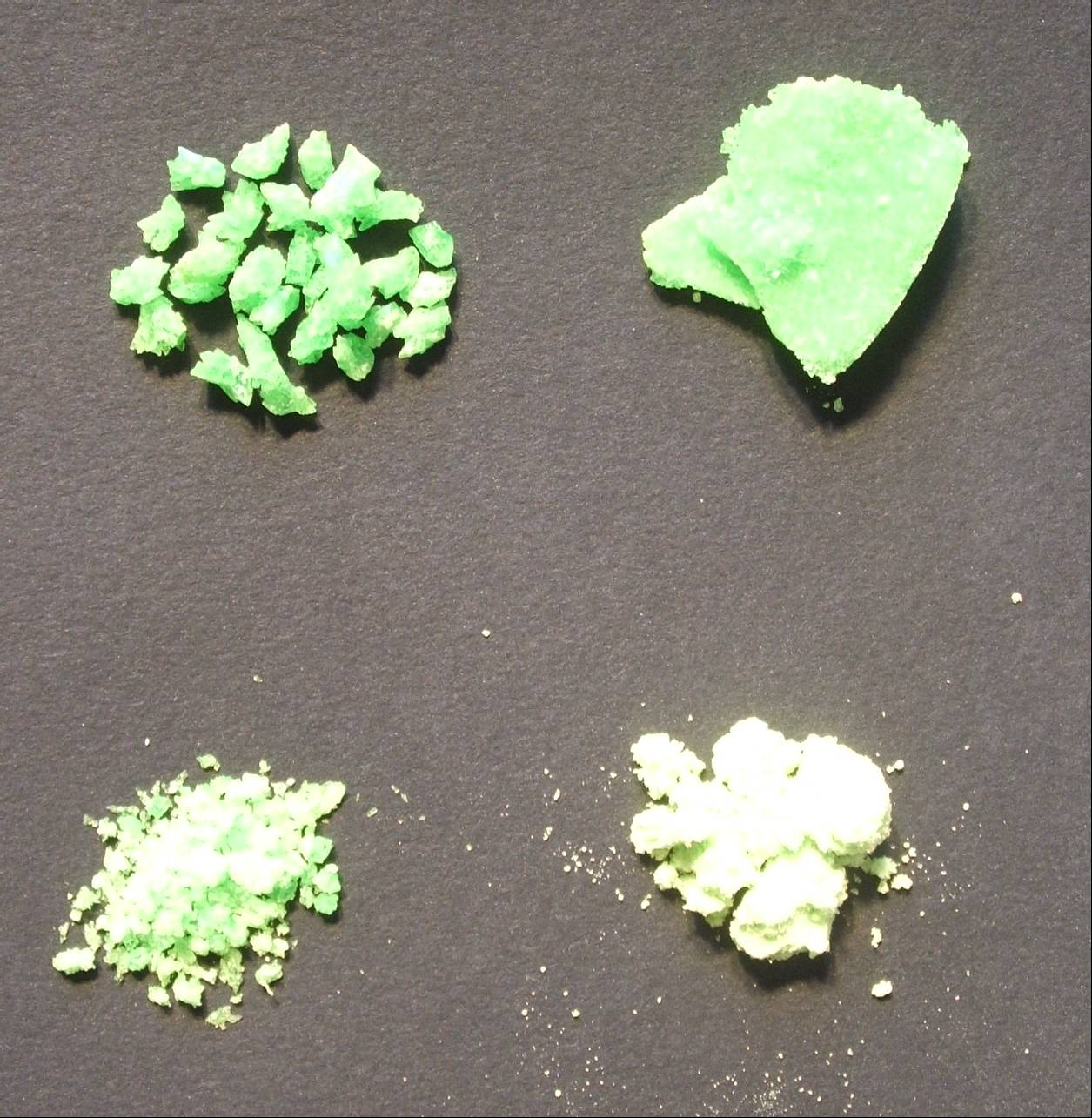
Sodium trisoxalatoferrate crystals

Sodium ferrioxalate can be obtained by mixing solutions of sodium oxalate and ferric oxalate, and waiting a few hours for the brown colour of the ferric oxalate to be replaced with the green colour of the complex anion.

3 Na_{2}C_{2}O_{4} + Fe_{2}(C_{2}O_{4})_{3} → 2 Na_{3}[Fe(C_{2}O_{4})_{3}]

The equilibrium is attained only slowly at room temperature. The product can then be crystallized by evaporating the solution at just below boiling until small crystals appear, then allowing it to cool. The product may also be precipitated by adding methanol or ethanol to the solution.

Some decomposition of the ferric oxalate may occur during the process, resulting in the canary-yellow insoluble iron(II) oxalate. Small amounts of hydrogen peroxide H_{2}O_{2} may be added to keep the iron in the 3+ oxidation state.
