= Actinometer =

Instrument for measuring thermal radiation

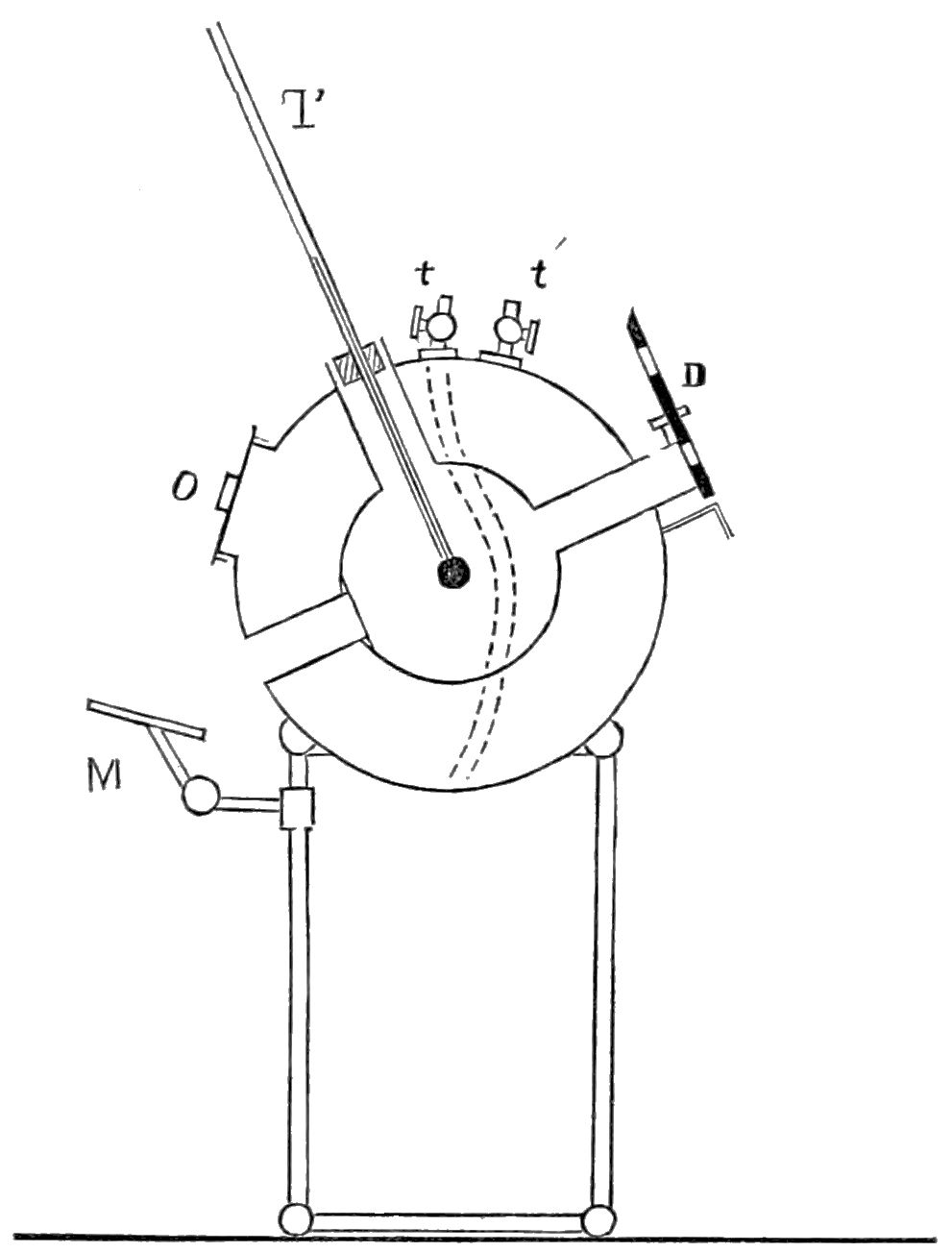
An actinometer instrument from the 1800s designed by John Herschel and used to estimate the temperature of the Sun's surface.

An actinometer is an instrument that can measure the heating power of radiation. Actinometers are used in meteorology to measure solar radiation as pyranometers, pyrheliometers and net radiometers.

An actinometer is a chemical system or physical device which determines the number of photons in a beam integrally or per unit time. This name is commonly applied to devices used in the ultraviolet and visible wavelength ranges. For example, solutions of iron(III) oxalate can be used as a chemical actinometer, while bolometers, thermopiles, and photodiodes are physical devices giving a reading that can be correlated to the number of photons detected.

== History ==
Swiss physicist Horace-Bénédict de Saussure invented an early version in the late 18th century. His design used a blackened thermometer enclosed in a glass sphere to measure solar radiation, which he referred to as a "heliothermometer." This instrument is considered one of the first tools to systematically measure solar intensity.

John Herschel further developed actinometers in the 19th century, including a design involving photochemical reactions to measure sunlight intensity, which was a significant step forward. Herschel's actinometer involved observing the rate of a chemical reaction under sunlight, which allowed for more precise quantification of solar energy. Herschel's version was influential and helped standardize measurements of solar energy. Herschel introduced the term actinometer, the first of many uses of the prefix actin for scientific instruments, effects, and processes.

The actinograph is a related device for estimating the actinic power of lighting for photography.

== Chemical actinometry ==
Chemical actinometry involves measuring radiant flux via the yield from a chemical reaction. This process requires a chemical with a known quantum yield and easily analyzed reaction products.

=== Choosing an actinometer ===
Potassium ferrioxalate is commonly used, as it is simple to use and sensitive over a wide range of relevant wavelengths (254 nm to 500 nm). Other actinometers include malachite green Leucocyanidins, vanadium(V)–iron(III) oxalate and monochloroacetic acid, however all of these actinometers undergo dark reactions, that is, they react in the absence of light. This is undesirable since it will have to be corrected for. Organic actinometers like butyrophenone or piperylene are analysed by gas chromatography. Other actinometers are more specific in terms of the range of wavelengths at which quantum yields have been determined. Reinecke's salt K[Cr(NH_{3})_{2}(NCS)_{4}] reacts in the near-UV region although it is thermally unstable. Uranyl oxalate has been used historically but is very toxic and cumbersome to analyze.

Recent investigations into nitrate photolysis have used 2-nitrobenzaldehyde and benzoic acid as a radical scavenger for hydroxyl radicals produced in the photolysis of hydrogen peroxide and sodium nitrate. However, they originally used ferrioxalate actinometry to calibrate the quantum yields for the hydrogen peroxide photolysis. Radical scavengers proved a viable method of measuring production of hydroxyl radical.

=== Chemical actinometry in the visible range ===
Meso-diphenylhelianthrene can be used for chemical actinometry in the visible range (400–700 nm). This chemical measures in the 475–610 nm range, but measurements in wider spectral ranges can be done with this chemical if the emission spectrum of the light source is known.

== Relative actinometry ==
Relative actinometry (sometimes called also comparative actinometry) is a technique frequently used to determine formation quantum yields of triplet excited states using comparison with a well known reference compound. The reference compound (for example [Ru(bpy)_{3}]^{2+}) and the compound of interest should be prepared separately in the identical cuvettes so that each of them has the same absorbance at the excitation wavelength chosen for the experiment. This means that upon the excitation, the same number of molecules will be promoted to the excited state, given that the experimental conditions are identical. The reference compound forms a photoproduct of a well-characterized formation quantum yield and molar absorption coefficient. This allows to calculate formation quantum yield or molar absorption coefficient for the photoproduct of the compound of interest. For example, when using transient absorption spectroscopy, one can calculate the formation quantum yield $\Phi_{x}$ of a certain compound's photoproduct characterized by difference molar absorption coefficient $\Delta \varepsilon_{x}(\lambda_{1})$:

$\Phi_{x} = \Phi_{ref} \cdot \frac{\Delta A_{x}(\lambda_{1})}{\Delta \varepsilon_{x}(\lambda_{1})} \cdot \frac{\Delta \varepsilon_{ref}(\lambda_{2})}{\Delta A_{ref}(\lambda_{2})} \cdot \frac{1 - 10^{-A_{ref}(\lambda_{ex})}}{ 1 - 10^{-A_{x}(\lambda_{ex})}}$

Note that in general $\Delta \varepsilon$ means the difference in molar absorption coefficients contributing before and after the excitation so that $\Delta \varepsilon = \varepsilon_{after} - \varepsilon_{before}$. $\Delta A_{x}(\lambda_{1})$ and $\Delta A_{ref}(\lambda_{2})$ are difference absorbance observed for compound of interest and the reference compound, respectively, for the relevant wavelengths. The formation quantum yield $\Phi_{ref}$, as well as the difference molar absorption coefficient $\Delta \varepsilon_{ref}(\lambda_{2})$ associated with the reference compound should be known before the experiment. The last term in the equation serves as a correction if the stationary absorbances of prepared solutions are not perfectly the same, however it shouldn't be far from unity. Excitation energy should be low enough to avoid nonlinear effect such as multiphoton absorption. This technique allows for characterization of certain photoproducts without explicit calculation of the number of absorbed photons, benefiting from the fact that imperfections of the measurement contribute in the same way for the compound of interest and the reference compound, so they effectively compensate.

== See also ==
- Actinograph
