= Ferrous =

Iron in its +2 oxidation state

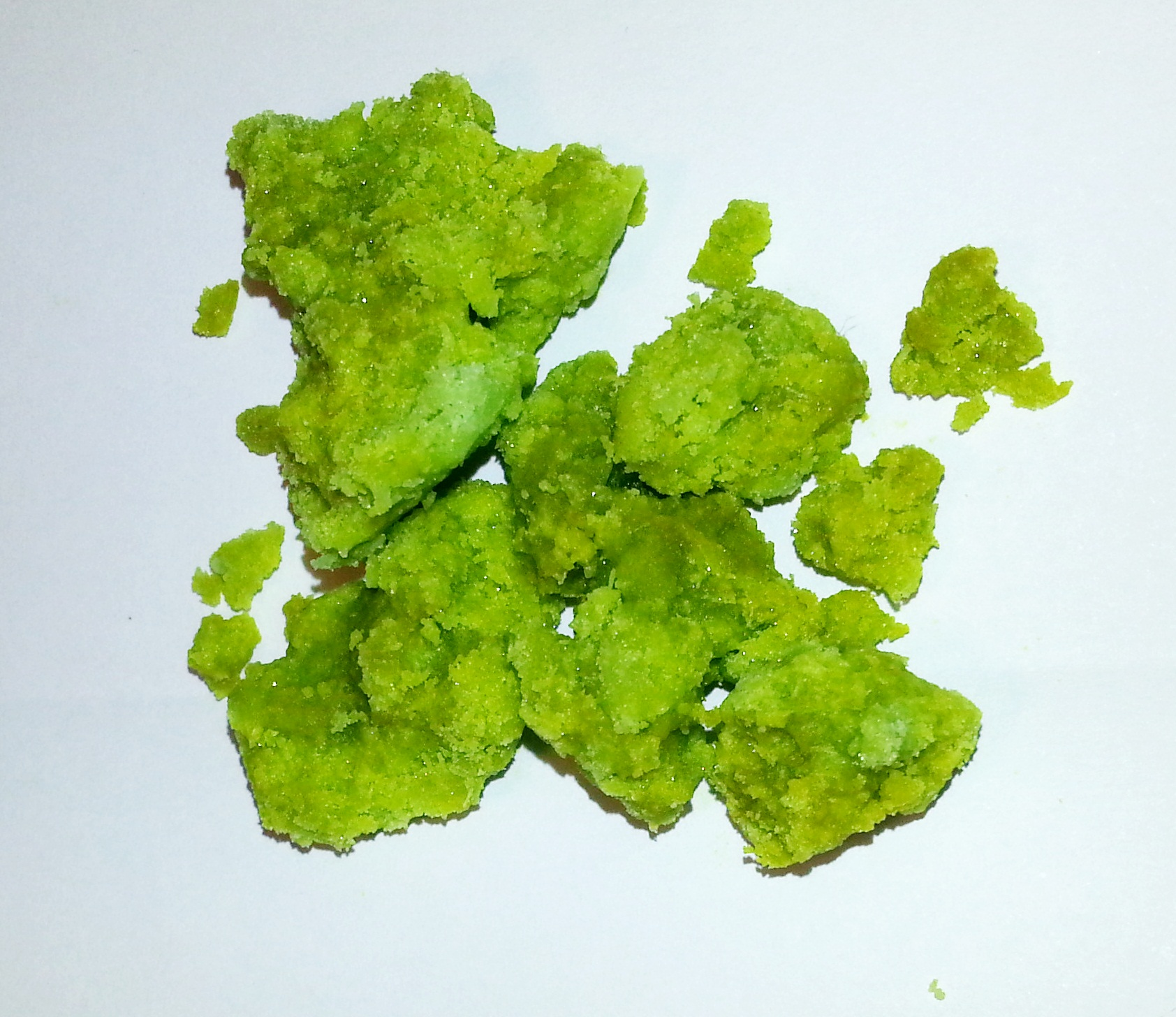
Iron(II) chloride tetrahydrate, FeCl_{2}·4H_{2}O.

In chemistry, iron(II) refers to the element iron in its +2 oxidation state. The adjective ferrous or the prefix ferro- is often used to specify such compounds, as in ferrous chloride for iron(II) chloride (FeCl_{2}). The adjective ferric is used instead for iron(III) salts, containing the cation Fe^{3+}. The word ferrous is derived from the Latin word ferrum, meaning "iron".

In ionic compounds (salts), such an atom may occur as a separate cation (positive ion) abbreviated as Fe^{2+}, although more precise descriptions include other ligands such as water and halides. Iron(II) centres occur in coordination complexes, such as in the anion ferrocyanide, [Fe(CN)_{6}]^{4−}, where six cyanide ligands are bound the metal centre; or, in organometallic compounds, such as the ferrocene [Fe(C_{5}H_{5})_{2}], where two cyclopentadienyl anions are bound to the Fe^{II} centre.

== Ferrous ions in biology ==
All known forms of life require iron. Many proteins in living beings contain iron(II) centers. Examples of such metalloproteins include hemoglobin, ferredoxin, and the cytochromes. In many of these proteins, Fe(II) converts reversibly to Fe(III).

Insufficient iron in the human diet causes anemia. Animals and humans can obtain the necessary iron from foods that contain it in assimilable form, such as meat. Other organisms must obtain their iron from the environment. However, iron tends to form highly insoluble iron(III) oxides/hydroxides in aerobic (oxygenated) environment, especially in calcareous soils. Bacteria and grasses can thrive in such environments by secreting compounds called siderophores that form soluble complexes with iron(III), that can be reabsorbed into the cell. (The other plants instead encourage the growth around their roots of certain bacteria that reduce iron(III) to the more soluble iron(II).)

Pourbaix diagram of aqueous iron

In contrast to iron(III) aquo complexes, iron(II) aquo complexes are soluble in water near neutral pH. Ferrous iron is, however, oxidized by the oxygen in air, converting to iron(III).

== Ferrous salts and complexes ==
Typically iron(II) salts, like the "chloride" are aquo complexes with the formulas [Fe(H_{2}O)_{6}]^{2+}, as found in Mohr's salt.

The aquo ligands on iron(II) complexes are labile. It reacts with 1,10-phenanthroline to give the blue iron(II) derivative:

When metallic iron (oxidation state 0) is placed in a solution of hydrochloric acid, iron(II) chloride is formed, with release of hydrogen gas, by the reaction

Fe^{0} + 2 H^{+} → Fe^{2+} + H_{2}

Iron(II) is oxidized by hydrogen peroxide to iron(III), forming a hydroxyl radical and a hydroxide ion in the process. This is the Fenton reaction. Iron(III) is then reduced back to iron(II) by another molecule of hydrogen peroxide, forming a hydroperoxyl radical and a proton. The net effect is a disproportionation of hydrogen peroxide to create two different oxygen-radical species, with water (H^{+} + OH^{−}) as a byproduct.

Fe^{2+} + H_{2}O_{2} → Fe^{3+} + HO^{•} + OH^{−}	1

Fe^{3+} + H_{2}O_{2} → Fe^{2+} + HOO^{•} + H^{+}	2

The free radicals generated by this process engage in secondary reactions, which can degrade many organic and biochemical compounds.

Redox reaction of [Fe(bipyridine)_{3}]^{2+}.

== Ferrous minerals and other solids ==
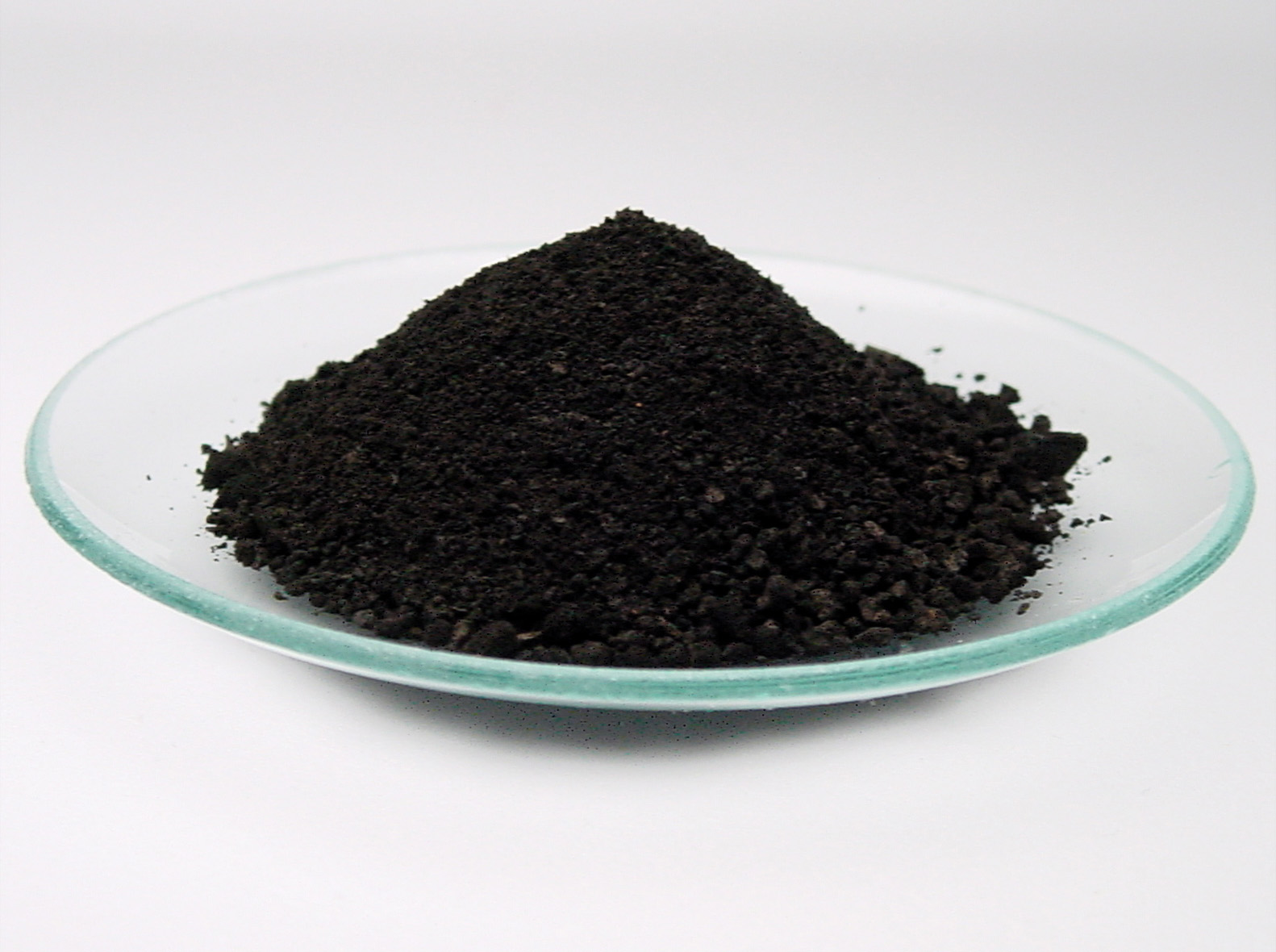
Iron(II) oxide (ferrous oxide), FeO, a very complicated material that contains iron(II)

Iron(II) is found in many minerals and solids. Examples include the sulfide and oxide, FeS and FeO. These formulas are deceptively simple because these sulfides and oxides are often nonstoichiometric. For example, "ferrous sulfide" can refer to the 1:1 species (mineral name troilite) or a host of Fe-deficient derivatives (pyrrhotite). The mineral magnetite ("lode stone") is a mixed-valence compound with both Fe(II) and Fe(III), Fe_{3}O_{4}.

== Bonding ==
d-orbital splitting scheme for low- and high spin octahedral Fe(II) complexes

Iron(II) is a d^{6} center, meaning that the metal has six "valence" electrons in the 3d orbital shell. The number and type of ligands bound to iron(II) determine how these electrons arrange themselves. With the so-called "strong field ligands" such as cyanide, the six electrons pair up. Thus ferrocyanide ([Fe(CN)_{6}]^{4−} has no unpaired electrons, meaning it is a low-spin complex. With so-called "weak field ligands" such as water, four of the six electrons are unpaired, meaning it is a high-spin complex. Thus aquo complex [Fe(H_{2}O)_{6}]^{2+} is paramagnetic. With chloride, iron(II) forms tetrahedral complexes, e.g. [FeCl_{4}]^{2−}. Tetrahedral complexes are high-spin complexes.

== Gallery ==
Selected Fe(II) compounds
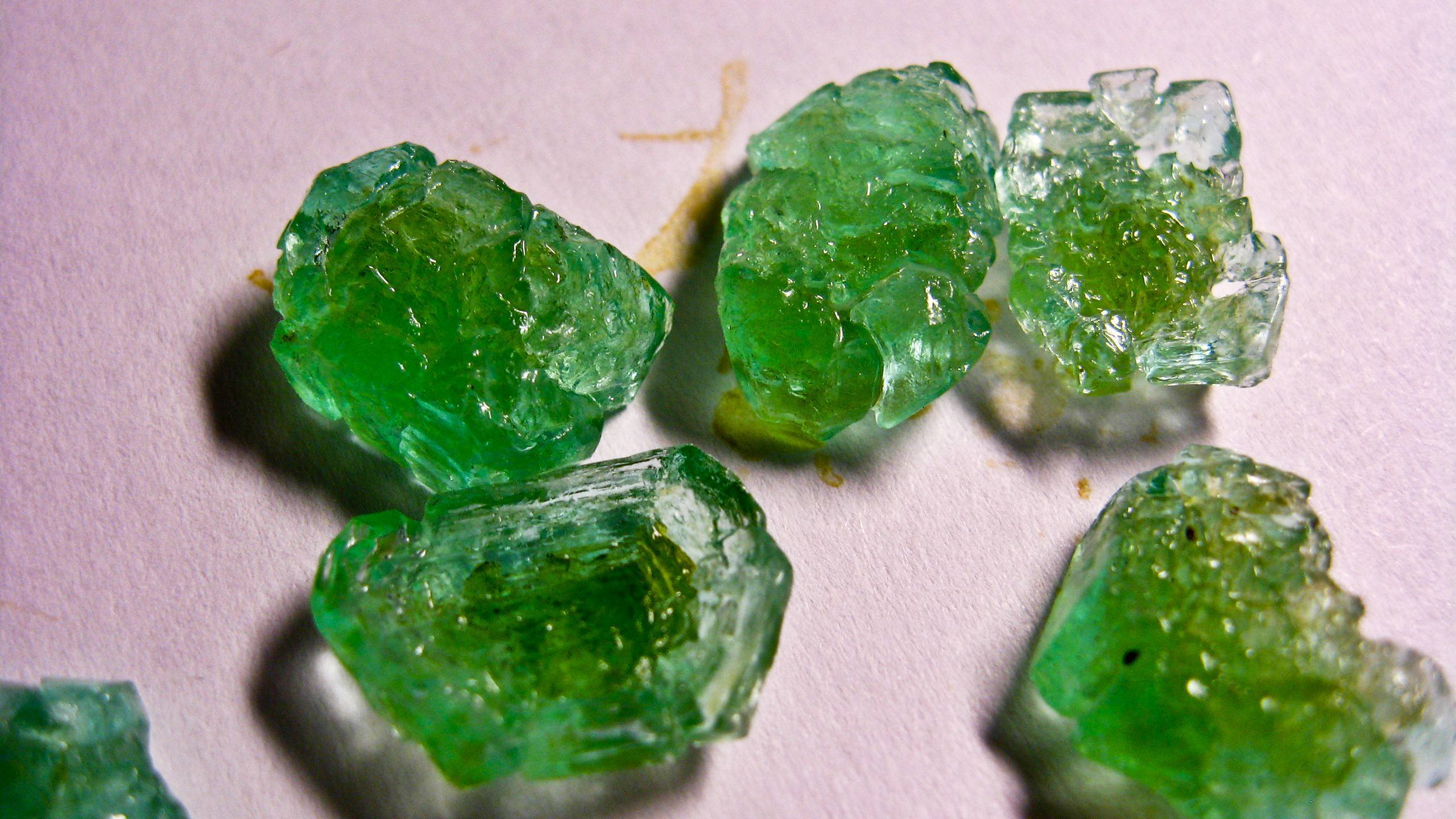
Ferrous nitrate hexahydrate, Fe(NO_{3})_{2}·6H_{2}O

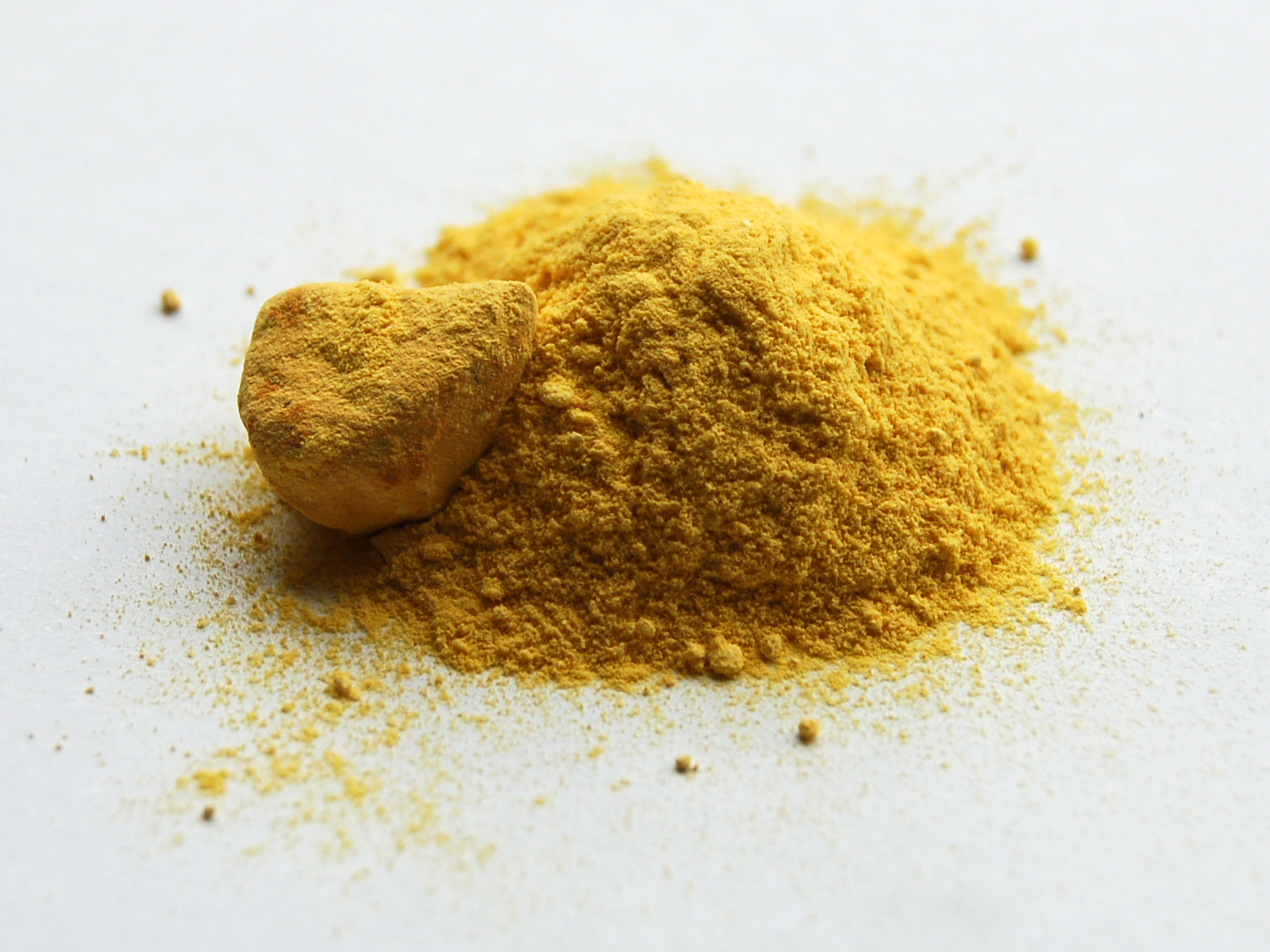
Ferrous oxalate dihydrate, Humboldtine, FeC_{2}O_{4}·2H_{2}O

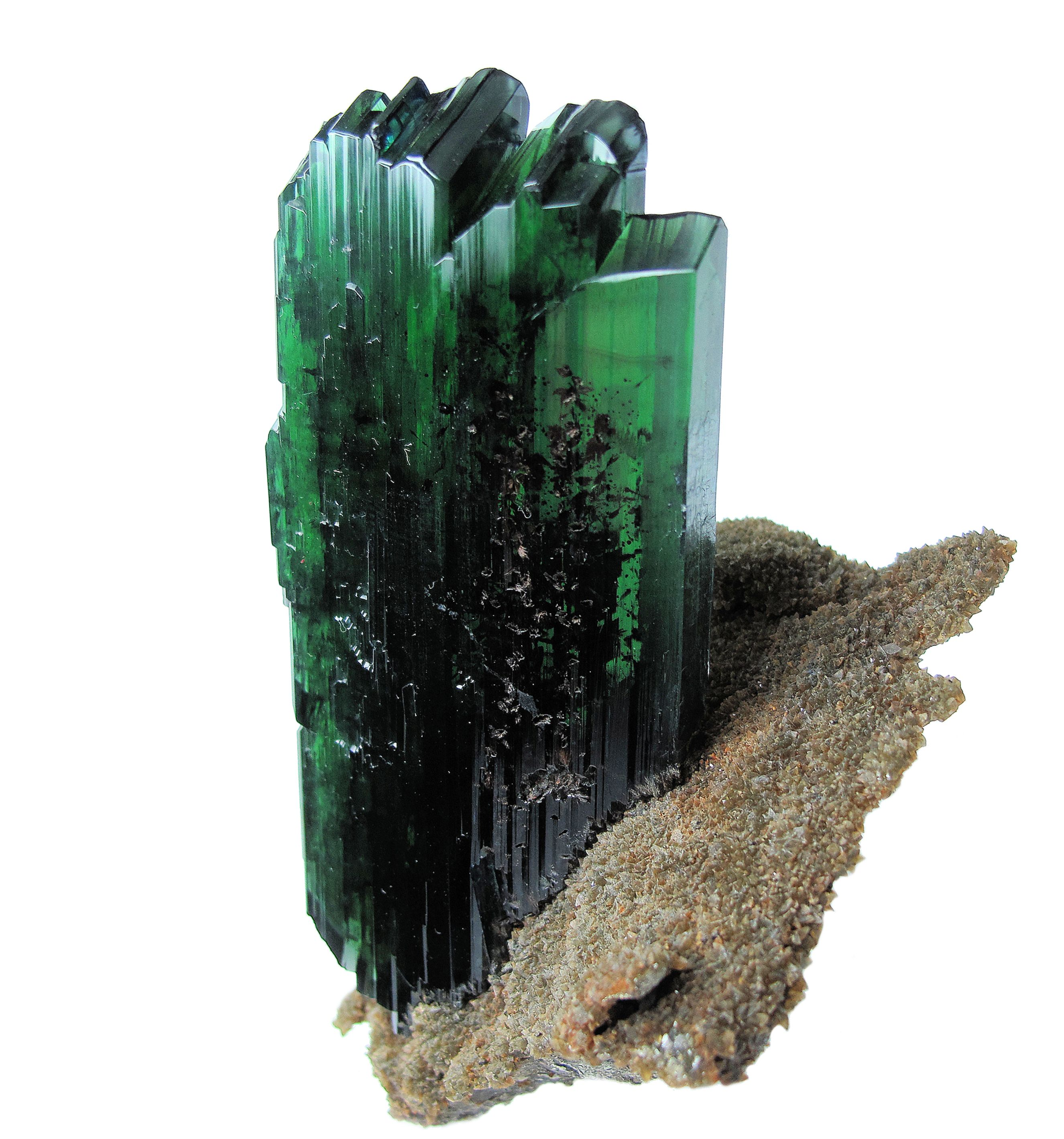
Vivianite, Ferrous phosphate octahydrate, Fe_{3}(PO_{4})_{2}·8H_{2}O

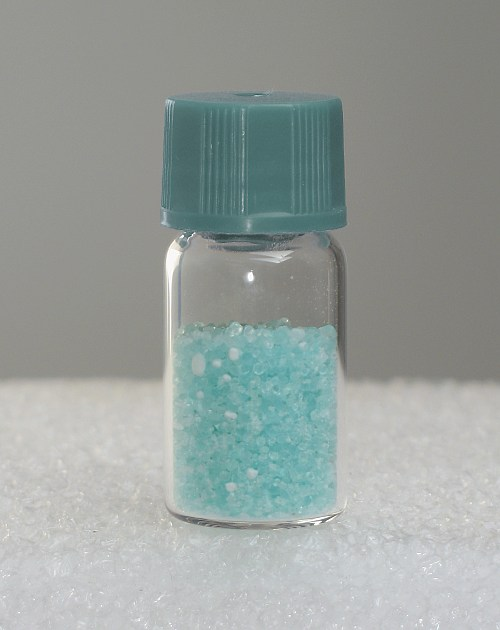
Ferrous sulfate heptahydrate, Melanterite, FeSO_{4}·7H_{2}O

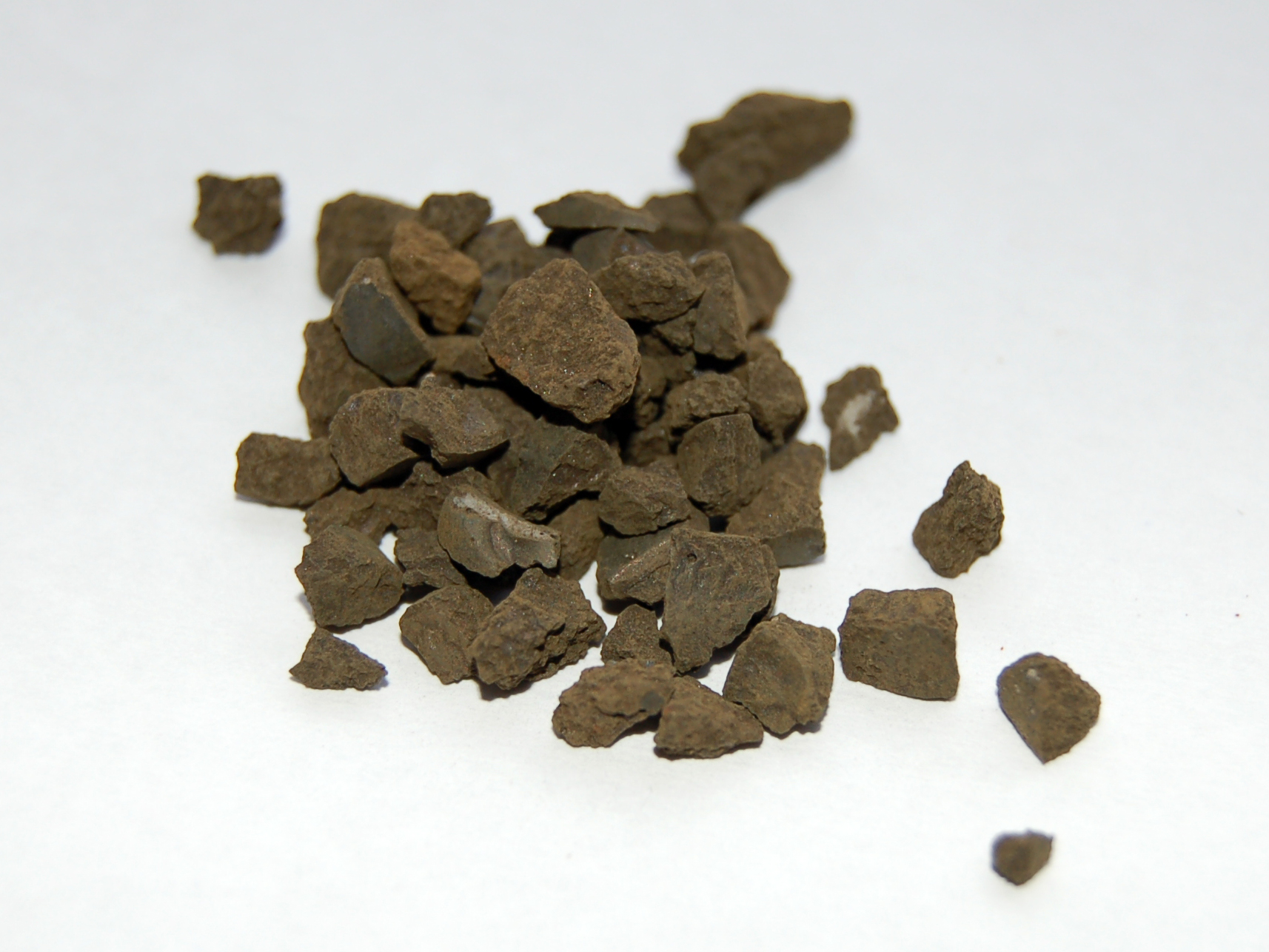
Ferrous sulfide, Troilite, FeS

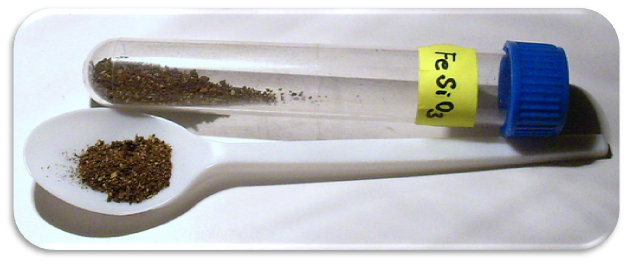
Ferrous silicate, Ferrosilite, FeSiO_{3}

== See also ==
- Ferromagnetism – Mechanism by which materials form into and are attracted to magnets
- Iron(II) oxide – Inorganic compound with the formula FeO (ferrous oxide)
- Iron(II) bromide (ferrous bromide)
- Category:Iron(II) minerals
