= Iron oxychloride =

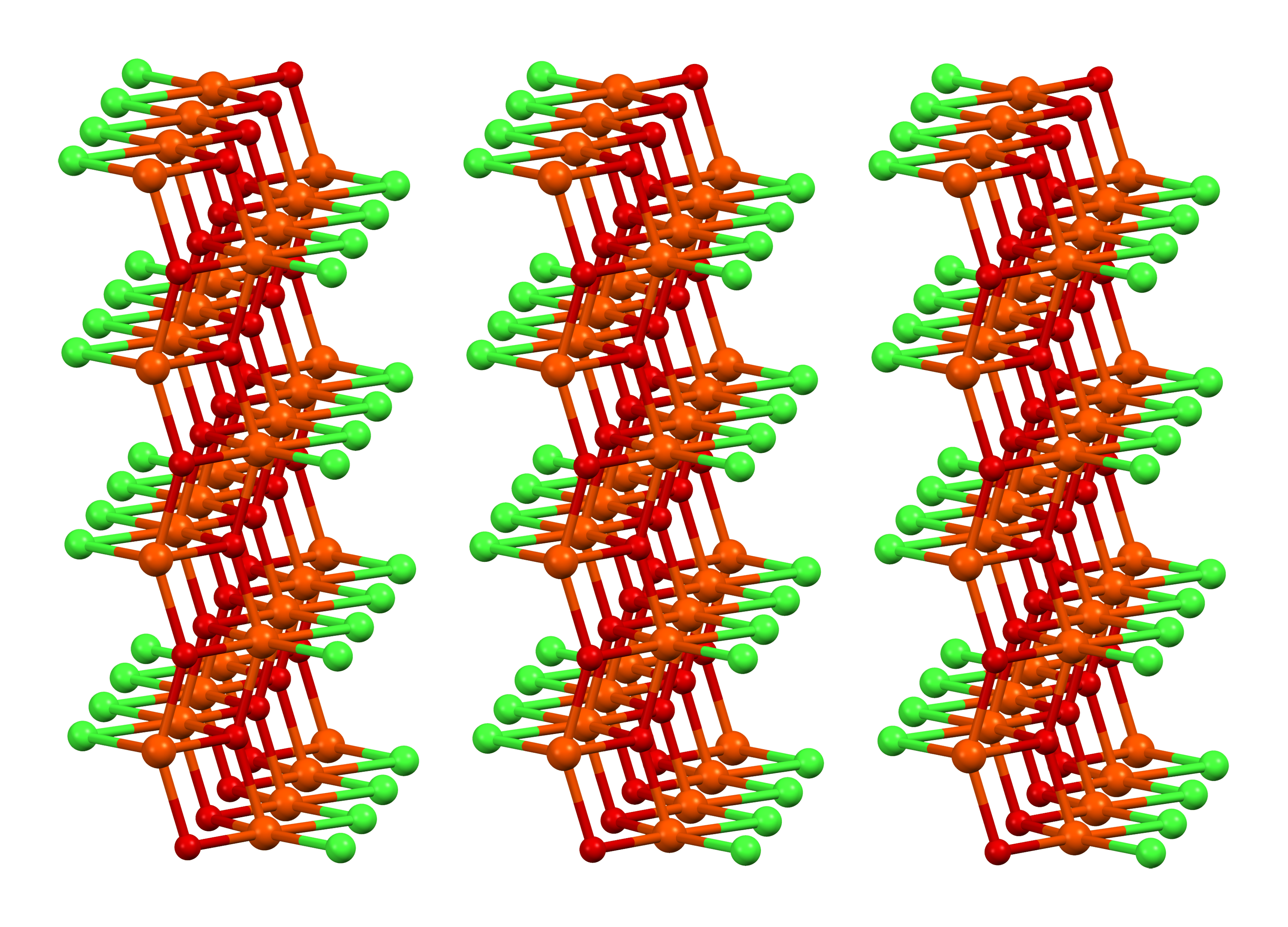

Names
- IUPAC name Iron oxychloride

Identifiers
CAS Number	56509-17-2
3D model (JSmol)	Interactive image
ChemSpider	4955733
ECHA InfoCard	100.054.740
EC Number	260-233-0
PubChem CID	6453349
CompTox Dashboard (EPA)	DTXSID10971959
- InChI: InChI=1S/ClH.Fe.O/h1H;;/q;+1;/p-1 Key: YPLPZEKZDGQOOQ-UHFFFAOYSA-M
- SMILES: O=[Fe]Cl

Properties
Chemical formula	ClFeO
Molar mass	107.29 g·mol^{−1}
Appearance	Vivid, dark violet, opaque crystals
- Except where otherwise noted, data are given for materials in their standard state (at 25 °C [77 °F], 100 kPa). verify (what is ?) Infobox references

Iron oxychloride is the inorganic compound with the formula FeOCl. This purple solid adopts a layered structure, akin to that of cadmium chloride. The material slowly hydrolyses in moist air. The solid intercalates electron donors such as tetrathiafulvalene and even pyridine to give mixed valence charge-transfer salts. Intercalation is accompanied by a marked increase in electrical conductivity and a color change to black.

== Production ==
FeOCl is prepared by heating iron(III) oxide with ferric chloride at 370 °C (698 °F) over the course of several days:

Fe_{2}O_{3} + FeCl_{3} → 3 FeOCl

Alternatively, FeOCl may be prepared by the thermal decomposition of FeCl_{3}⋅6H_{2}O at 220 °C (428 °F) over the course of one hour:

FeCl_{3} ⋅ 6H_{2}O → FeOCl + 5 H_{2}O + 2 HCl
