= Tetrachloroferrate =

Identifiers
3D model (JSmol)	Interactive image
ChEBI	CHEBI:30811
ChemSpider	25557
Gmelin Reference	26231
PubChem CID	27463
- InChI: InChI=1S/4ClH.Fe/h4*1H;/q;;;;+3/p-4 Key: HCQLFHJKDCJBSQ-UHFFFAOYSA-J
- SMILES: Cl[Fe-](Cl)(Cl)Cl

Properties
Chemical formula	Cl_{4}Fe^{−1}
Molar mass	197.65 g·mol^{−1}
- Except where otherwise noted, data are given for materials in their standard state (at 25 °C [77 °F], 100 kPa). Infobox references

Tetrachloroferrate is the polyatomic ion having chemical formula FeCl^{−}_{4}. The metallate can be formed when ferric chloride (FeCl_{3}) abstracts a chloride ion from various other chloride salts. The resulting tetrachloroferrate salts are typically soluble in non-polar solvents. The tetrachloroferrate anion, with iron(III) in the center, has tetrahedral geometry. It is useful as a non-coordinating anion comparable to perchlorate. Several organoammonium salts have been studied for their novel material properties. 1-Butyl-3-methylimidazolium tetrachloroferrate is one of several ionic liquids that are magnetic. Trimethylchloromethylammonium tetrachloroferrate is a plastic crystal that can behave as a molecular switch in response to several different types of inputs.
