= Iron(III) chloride =

Inorganic compound of Iron

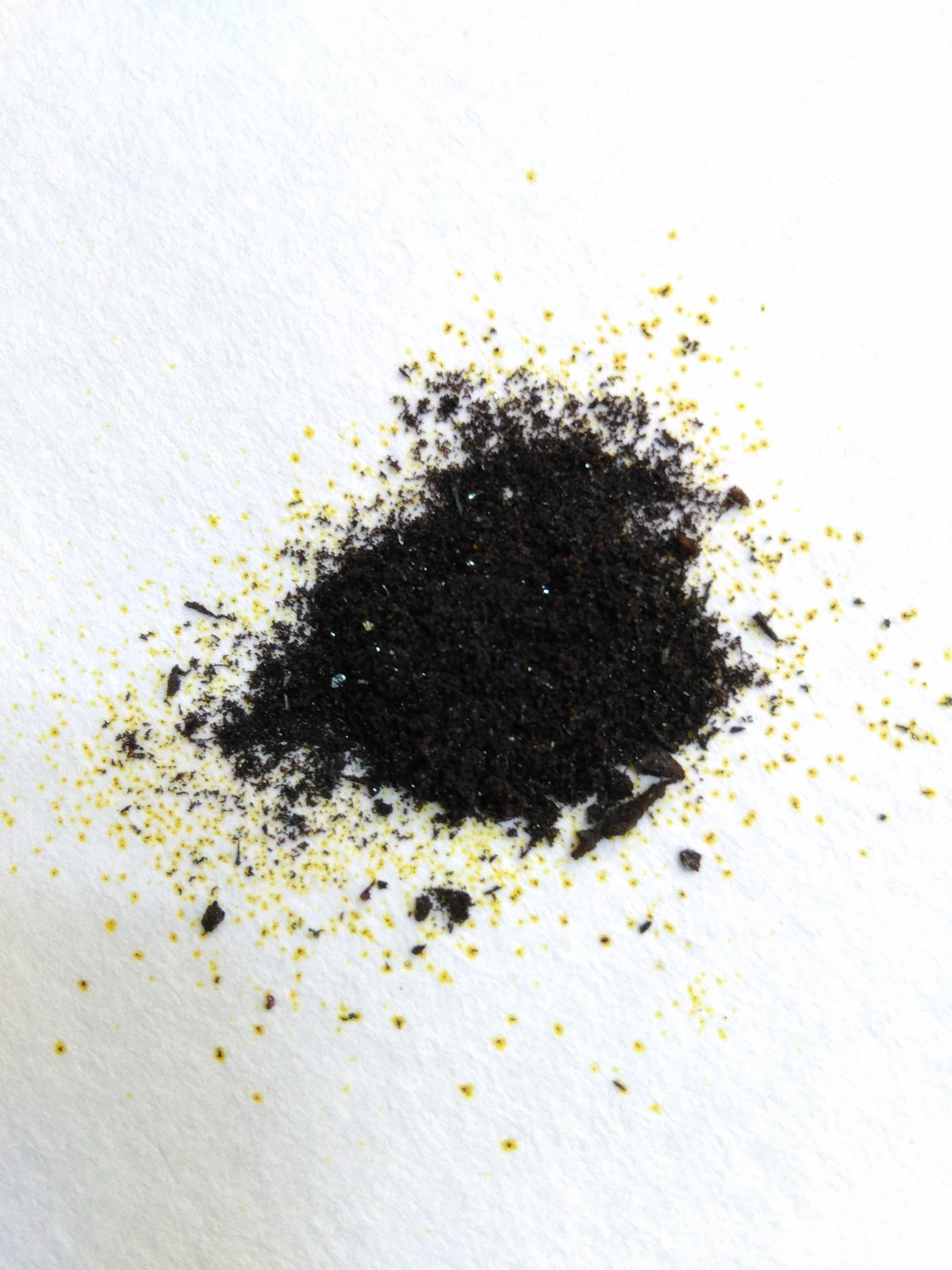
Iron(III) chloride (anhydrous)
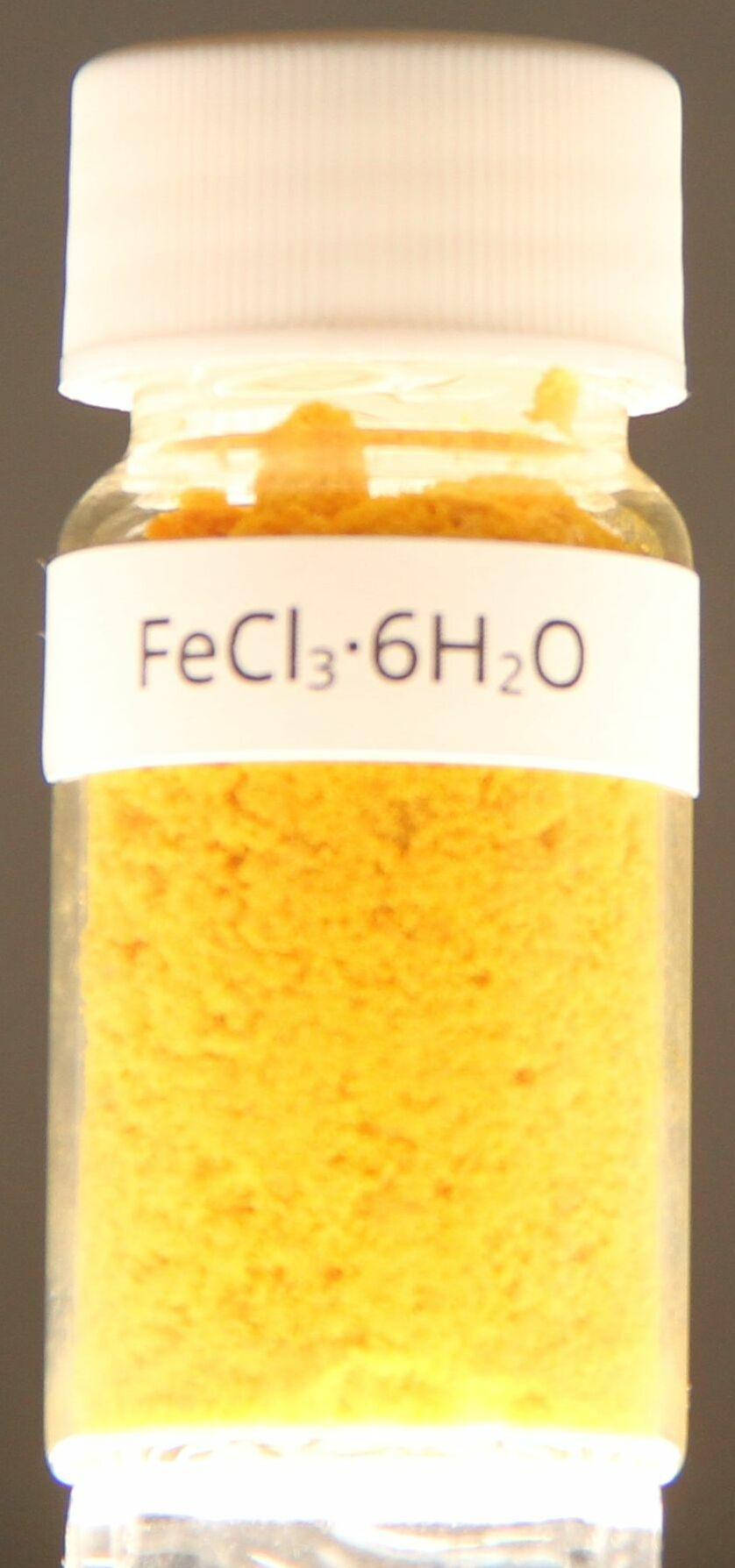
Iron(III) chloride (hydrate)
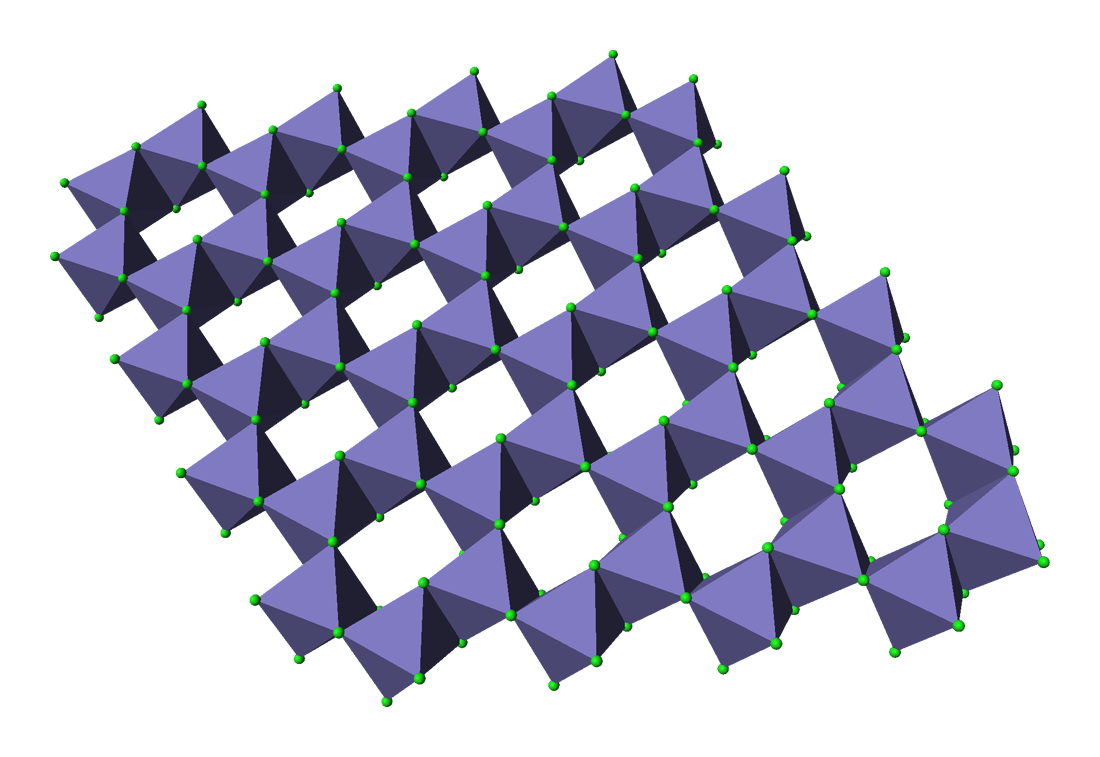

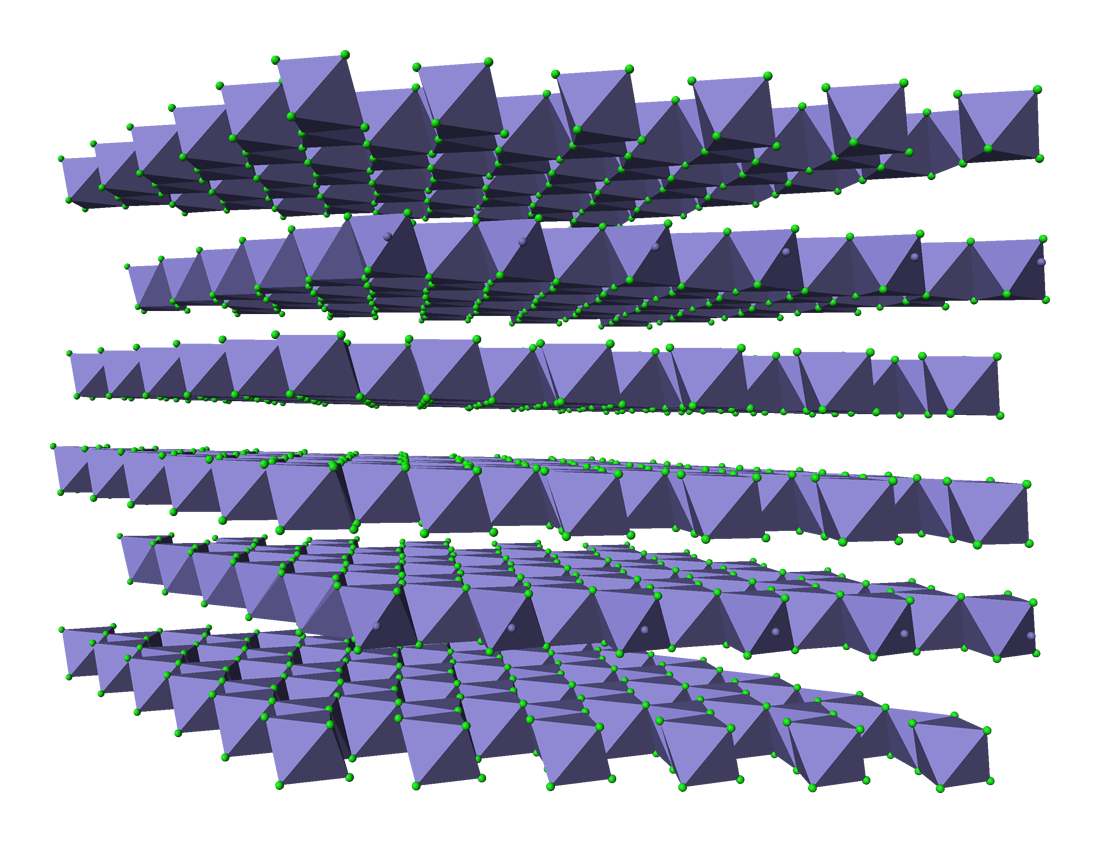

Names
- IUPAC names Iron(III) chloride Iron trichloride
- Other names: Ferric chloride; Molysite; Flores martis

Identifiers
CAS Number	7705-08-0; 10025-77-1 (hexahydrate); 54862-84-9 (dihydrate); 64333-00-2 (3.5hydrate)
3D model (JSmol)	Interactive image
ChEBI	CHEBI:30808
ChemSpider	22792
ECHA InfoCard	100.028.846
EC Number	231-729-4
PubChem CID	24380
RTECS number	LJ9100000
UNII	U38V3ZVV3V; 0I2XIN602U (hexahydrate); Y048945596 (dihydrate)
UN number	1773 (anhydrous); 2582 (aqueous solution)
CompTox Dashboard (EPA)	DTXSID8020622
- InChI: InChI=1S/3ClH.Fe/h3*1H;/q;;;+3/p-3 Key: RBTARNINKXHZNM-UHFFFAOYSA-K; InChI=1S/3ClH.Fe/h3*1H;/q;;;+3/p-3 Key: RBTARNINKXHZNM-DFZHHIFOAF; Key: RBTARNINKXHZNM-UHFFFAOYSA-K
- SMILES: Cl[Fe](Cl)Cl

Properties
Chemical formula	FeCl_{3}
Molar mass	162.204 g/mol (anhydrous); 270.295 g/mol (hexahydrate)
Appearance	Green-black by reflected light; purple-red by transmitted light; yellow solid as hexahydrate; brown as aqueous solution
Odor	Slight HCl
Density	2.90 g/cm^{3} (anhydrous); 1.82 g/cm^{3} (hexahydrate)
Melting point	307.6 °C (585.7 °F; 580.8 K) (anhydrous); 37 °C (99 °F; 310 K) (hexahydrate)
Boiling point	316 °C (601 °F; 589 K) (anhydrous, decomposes); 280 °C (536 °F; 553 K) (hexahydrate, decomposes)
Solubility in water	912 g/L (anhydrous or hexahydrate, 25 °C)
Solubility in: Acetone; Methanol; Ethanol; Diethyl ether	630 g/L (18 °C); Highly soluble; 830 g/L; Highly soluble
Magnetic susceptibility (χ)	+13,450·10^{−6} cm^{3}/mol
Viscosity	12 cP (40% solution)

Hazards (Note: An alternative GHS classification from the Japanese GHS Inter-ministerial Committee (2006) notes the possibility of respiratory tract irritation from FeCl_{3} and differs slightly in other respects from the classification used here.)
- GHS labelling
Pictograms	
Signal word	Danger
Hazard statements	H290, H302, H314
Precautionary statements	P234, P260, P264, P270, P273, P280, P301+P312, P301+P330+P331, P303+P361+P353, P304+P340, P305+P351+P338, P310, P321, P363, P390, P405, P501
NFPA 704 (fire diamond)	2 0 0
Flash point	Non-flammable
- NIOSH (US health exposure limits)
REL (Recommended)	TWA 1 mg/m^{3}
Safety data sheet (SDS)	ICSC 1499

Related compounds
Other anions	Iron(III) fluoride; Iron(III) bromide
Other cations	Iron(II) chloride; Manganese(II) chloride; Cobalt(II) chloride; Ruthenium(III) chloride
Related coagulants	Iron(II) sulfate; Polyaluminium chloride

Structure
Crystal structure	Hexagonal, hR24
Space group	R3̅, No. 148
Lattice constant	a = 0.6065 nm, b = 0.6065 nm, c = 1.742 nm α = 90°, β = 90°, γ = 120°
Formula units (Z)	6
Coordination geometry	Octahedral
- Except where otherwise noted, data are given for materials in their standard state (at 25 °C [77 °F], 100 kPa). verify (what is ?) Infobox references

Iron(III) chloride, also called ferric chloride, is an inorganic compound with the formula FeCl_{3}. It forms hydrates FeCl_{3}·xH_{2}O. These compounds are some of the most important and commonplace compounds of iron. They are available both in anhydrous and in hydrated forms, which are both hygroscopic. They feature iron in its +3 oxidation state. The anhydrous derivative is a Lewis acid, while all forms are mild oxidizing agents. It is used as a water cleaner and as an etchant for metals.

== Electronic and optical properties ==
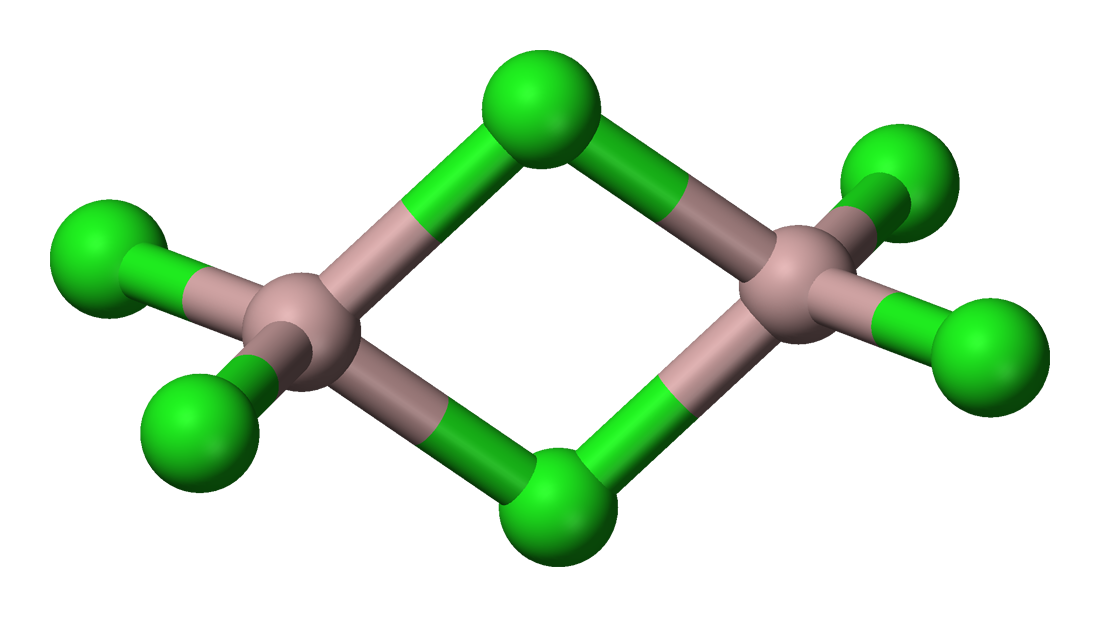
Anhydrous iron(III) chloride evaporates at relatively low temperatures to give the bitetrahedral dimer.

All forms of ferric chloride are paramagnetic, owing to the presence of unpaired electrons residing in 3d orbitals. Although Fe(III) chloride can be octahedral or tetrahedral (or both, see structure section), all of these forms have five unpaired electrons, one per d-orbital. The high spin d^{5} electronic configuration requires that d-d electronic transitions are spin forbidden, in addition to violating the Laporte rule. This double forbidden-ness results in its solutions being only pale colored. Or, stated more technically, the optical transitions are non-intense. Aqueous ferric sulfate and ferric nitrate, which contain [Fe(H_{2}O)_{6}]^{3+}, are nearly colorless, whereas the chloride solutions are yellow. Thus, the chloride ligands significantly influence the optical properties of the iron center.

== Structure ==
Iron(III) chloride can exist as an anhydrous material and a series of hydrates, which results in distinct structures.

=== Anhydrous ===
The anhydrous compound is a hygroscopic crystalline solid with a melting point of 307.6 °C. The colour depends on the viewing angle: by reflected light, the crystals appear dark green, but by transmitted light, they appear purple-red. Anhydrous iron(III) chloride has the BiI_{3} structure, with octahedral Fe(III) centres interconnected by two-coordinate chloride ligands.

Iron(III) chloride has a relatively low melting point, and boils at around 315 °C. The vapor consists of the dimer Fe_{2}Cl_{6}, much like aluminium chloride. This dimer dissociates into the monomeric FeCl_{3} (with D_{3h} point group molecular symmetry) at higher temperatures, in competition with its reversible decomposition to give iron(II) chloride and chlorine gas.

=== Hydrates ===
Ferric chloride form hydrates upon exposure to water, reflecting its Lewis acidity. All hydrates exhibit deliquescence, meaning that they become liquid by absorbing moisture from the air. Hydration invariably gives derivatives of aquo complexes with the formula [FeCl_{2}(H_{2}O)_{4}]^{+}. This cation can adopt either trans or cis stereochemistry, reflecting the relative location of the chloride ligands on the octahedral Fe center. Four hydrates have been characterized by X-ray crystallography: the dihydrate FeCl_{3}·2H_{2}O, the disesquihydrate FeCl_{3}·2.5H_{2}O, the trisesquihydrate FeCl_{3}·3.5H_{2}O, and finally the hexahydrate FeCl_{3}·6H_{2}O. These species differ with respect to the stereochemistry of the octahedral iron cation, the identity of the anions, and the presence or absence of water of crystallization. The structural formulas are [trans−FeCl_{2}(H_{2}O)_{4}][FeCl_{4}], [cis−FeCl_{2}(H_{2}O)_{4}][FeCl_{4}]·H_{2}O, [cis−FeCl_{2}(H_{2}O)_{4}][FeCl_{4}]·H_{2}O, and [trans−FeCl_{2}(H_{2}O)_{4}]Cl·2H_{2}O. The first three members of this series have the tetrahedral tetrachloroferrate ([FeCl_{4}]^{−}) anion.

=== Solution ===
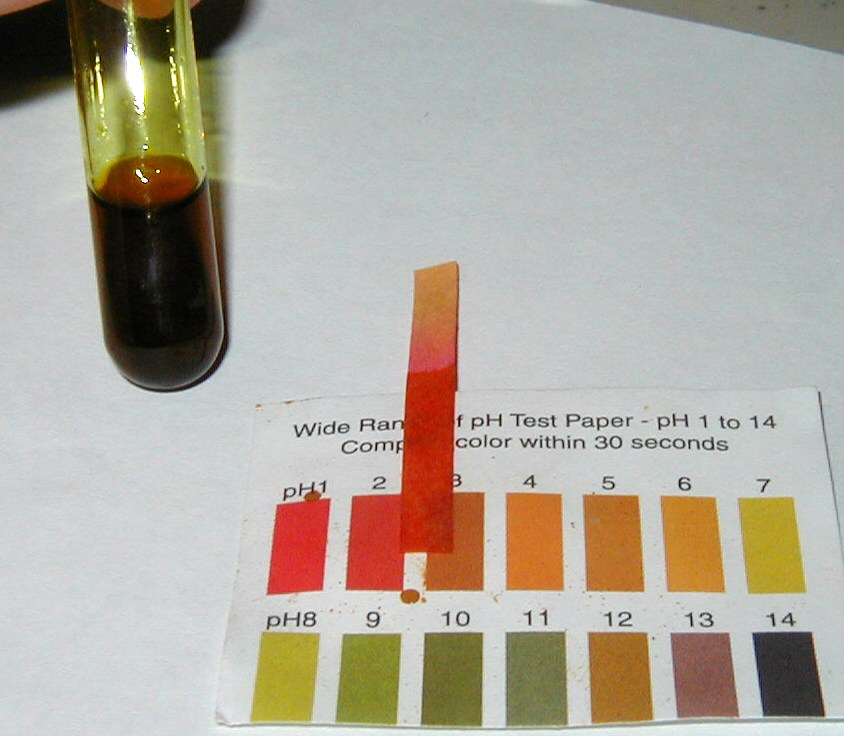
A brown, acidic solution of iron(III) chloride.

Like the solid hydrates, aqueous solutions of ferric chloride also consist of the octahedral [FeCl_{2}(H_{2}O)_{4}]^{+} of unspecified stereochemistry. Detailed speciation of aqueous solutions of ferric chloride is challenging because the individual components do not have distinctive spectroscopic signatures. Iron(III) complexes, with a high spin d^{5} configuration, are kinetically labile, which means that ligands rapidly dissociate and reassociate. A further complication is that these solutions are strongly acidic, as expected for aquo complexes of a tricationic metal. Iron aquo complexes are prone to olation, the formation of polymeric oxo derivatives. Dilute solutions of ferric chloride produce soluble nanoparticles with molecular weight of 10^{4}, which exhibit the property of "aging", i.e., the structure change or evolve over the course of days. The polymeric species formed by the hydrolysis of ferric chlorides are key to the use of ferric chloride for water treatment.

In contrast to the complicated behavior of its aqueous solutions, solutions of iron(III) chloride in diethyl ether and tetrahydrofuran are well-behaved. Both ethers form 1:2 adducts of the general formula FeCl_{3}(ether)_{2}. In these complexes, the iron is pentacoordinate.

== Preparation ==
Several hundred tons of anhydrous iron(III) chloride are produced annually. The principal method, called direct chlorination, uses scrap iron as a precursor:

2 Fe + 3 Cl_{2} → 2 FeCl_{3}

The reaction is conducted at several hundred degrees such that the product is gaseous. Using excess chlorine guarantees that the intermediate ferrous chloride is converted to the ferric state. A similar but laboratory-scale process also has been described.

Aqueous solutions of iron(III) chloride are also produced industrially from a number of iron precursors, including iron oxides:

Fe_{2}O_{3} + 6 HCl + 9 H_{2}O → 2 FeCl_{3}(H_{2}O)_{6}

In complementary route, iron metal can be oxidized by hydrochloric acid followed by chlorination:

Fe + 2 HCl → FeCl_{2} + H_{2}
FeCl_{2} + 0.5 Cl_{2} + 6 H_{2}O → FeCl_{3}(H_{2}O)_{6}

A number of variables apply to these processes, including the oxidation of iron by ferric chloride and the hydration of intermediates. Hydrates of iron(III) chloride do not readily yield anhydrous ferric chloride. Attempted thermal dehydration yields hydrochloric acid and iron oxychloride. In the laboratory, hydrated iron(III) chloride can be converted to the anhydrous form by treatment with thionyl chloride or trimethylsilyl chloride:

FeCl_{3}·6H_{2}O + 12 (CH_{3})_{3}SiCl → FeCl_{3} + 6 ((CH_{3})_{3}Si)_{2}O + 12 HCl
FeCl_{3}·6H_{2}O + 6 SOCl_{2} → FeCl_{3} + 6 SO_{2} + 12 HCl

== Reactions ==
Being high spin d^{5} electronic configuration iron(III) chlorides are labile, meaning that its Cl- and H_{2}O ligands exchange rapidly with free chloride and water. In contrast to their kinetic lability, iron(III) chlorides are thermodynamically robust, as reflected by the vigorous methods applied to their synthesis, as described above.

=== Anhydrous FeCl_{3} ===
Aside from lability, which applies to anhydrous and hydrated forms, the reactivity of anhydrous ferric chloride reveals two trends: It is a Lewis acid and an oxidizing agent.

Reactions of anhydrous iron(III) chloride reflect its description as both oxophilic and a hard Lewis acid. Myriad manifestations of the oxophiliicty of iron(III) chloride are available. When heated with iron(III) oxide at 350 °C it reacts to give iron oxychloride:

FeCl_{3} + Fe_{2}O_{3} → 3FeOCl

Alkali metal alkoxides react to give the iron(III) alkoxide complexes. These products have more complicated structures than anhydrous iron(III) chloride. In the solid phase a variety of multinuclear complexes have been described for the nominal stoichiometric reaction between FeCl_{3} and sodium ethoxide:

FeCl_{3} + 3 CH_{3}CH_{2}ONa → "Fe(OCH_{2}CH_{3})_{3}" + 3 NaCl

Iron(III) chloride forms a 1:2 adduct with Lewis bases such as triphenylphosphine oxide; e.g., FeCl_{3}(OP(C_{6}H_{5})_{3})_{2}. The related 1:2 complex FeCl_{3}(OEt_{2})_{2}, where Et = C_{2}H_{5}), has been crystallized from ether solution.

Iron(III) chloride also reacts with tetraethylammonium chloride to give the yellow salt of the tetrachloroferrate ion ((Et_{4}N)[FeCl_{4}]). Similarly, combining FeCl_{3} with NaCl and KCl gives Na[FeCl_{4}] and K[FeCl_{4}], respectively.

In addition to these simple stoichiometric reactions, the Lewis acidity of ferric chloride enables its use in a variety of acid-catalyzed reactions as described below in the section on organic chemistry.

In terms of its being an oxidant, iron(III) chloride oxidizes iron powder to form iron(II) chloride via a comproportionation reaction:

2 FeCl_{3} + Fe → 3 FeCl_{2}

A traditional synthesis of anhydrous ferrous chloride is the reduction of FeCl_{3} with chlorobenzene:

2 FeCl_{3} + C_{6}H_{5}Cl → 2 FeCl_{2} + C_{6}H_{4}Cl_{2} + HCl

Iron(III) chloride releases chlorine gas when heated above 160 °C, generating ferrous chloride:

2FeCl_{3} → 2FeCl_{2} + Cl_{2}

To suppress this reaction, the preparation of iron(III) chloride requires an excess of chlorinating agent, as discussed above.

=== Hydrated FeCl_{3} ===
Unlike the anhydrous material, hydrated ferric chloride is not a particularly strong Lewis acid since water ligands have quenched the Lewis acidity by binding to Fe(III). Instead, it is a Brønsted-Lowry acid, as the hydrogen atoms on the water ligands become more acidic when the water ligands bond to Fe(III).

Like the anhydrous material, hydrated ferric chloride is oxophilic. For example, oxalate salts react rapidly with aqueous iron(III) chloride to give [Fe(C_{2}O_{4})_{3}]^{3−}, known as ferrioxalate. Other carboxylate sources, e.g., citrate and tartrate, bind as well to give carboxylate complexes. The affinity of iron(III) for oxygen ligands was the basis of qualitative tests for phenols. Although superseded by spectroscopic methods, the ferric chloride test is a traditional colorimetric test. The affinity of iron(III) for phenols is exploited in the Trinder spot test.

Aqueous iron(III) chloride serves as a one-electron oxidant illustrated by its reaction with copper(I) chloride to give copper(II) chloride and iron(II) chloride.

FeCl_{3} + CuCl → FeCl_{2} + CuCl_{2}

This fundamental reaction is relevant to the use of ferric chloride solutions in etching copper.

=== Organometallic chemistry ===
The interaction of anhydrous iron(III) chloride with organolithium and organomagnesium compounds has been examined often. These studies are enabled because of the solubility of FeCl_{3} in ethereal solvents, which avoids the possibility of hydrolysis of the nucleophilic alkylating agents. Such studies may be relevant to the mechanism of FeCl_{3}-catalyzed cross-coupling reactions. The isolation of organoiron(III) intermediates requires low-temperature reactions, lest the [FeR_{4}]^{−} intermediates degrade. Using methylmagnesium bromide as the alkylation agent, salts of Fe(CH_{3})_{4}]^{−} have been isolated. Illustrating the sensitivity of these reactions, methyl lithium LiCH_{3} reacts with iron(III) chloride to give lithium tetrachloroferrate(II) Li_{2}[FeCl_{4}]:

2 FeCl_{3} + LiCH_{3} → FeCl_{2} + Li[FeCl_{4}] + 0.5 CH_{3}CH_{3}
Li[FeCl_{4}] + LiCH_{3} → Li_{2}[FeCl_{4}] + 0.5 CH_{3}CH_{3}

To a significant extent, iron(III) acetylacetonate and related beta-diketonate complexes are more widely used than FeCl_{3} as ether-soluble sources of ferric ion. These diketonate complexes have the advantages that they do not form hydrates, unlike iron(III) chloride, and they are more soluble in relevant solvents. Cyclopentadienyl magnesium bromide undergoes a complex reaction with iron(III) chloride, resulting in ferrocene:

3 C_{5}H_{5}MgBr + FeCl_{3} → Fe(C_{5}H_{5})_{2} + 1/n (C_{5}H_{5})_{n} + 3 MgBrCl

This conversion, although not of practical value, was important in the history of organometallic chemistry where ferrocene is emblematic of the field.

== Uses ==
=== Water treatment ===
The largest applications of iron(III) chloride are sewage treatment and drinking water production. By forming highly dispersed networks of Fe-O-Fe containing materials, ferric chlorides serve as coagulant and flocculants. In this application, an aqueous solution of FeCl_{3} is treated with base to form a floc of iron(III) hydroxide (Fe(OH)_{3}), also formulated as FeO(OH) (ferrihydrite). This floc facilitates the separation of suspended materials, clarifying the water.

Iron(III) chloride is also used to remove soluble phosphate from wastewater. Iron(III) phosphate is insoluble and thus precipitates as a solid. One potential advantage of its use in water treatment, is that the ferric ion oxidizes (deodorizes) hydrogen sulfide.

=== Etching and metal cleaning ===
It is also used as a leaching agent in chloride hydrometallurgy, for example in the production of Si from FeSi (Silgrain process by Elkem).

In another commercial application, a solution of iron(III) chloride is useful for etching copper according to the following equation:

2 FeCl_{3} + Cu → 2 FeCl_{2} + CuCl_{2}

The soluble copper(II) chloride is rinsed away, leaving a copper pattern. This chemistry is used in the production of printed circuit boards (PCB).

Iron(III) chloride is used in many other hobbies involving metallic objects.

=== Organic chemistry ===
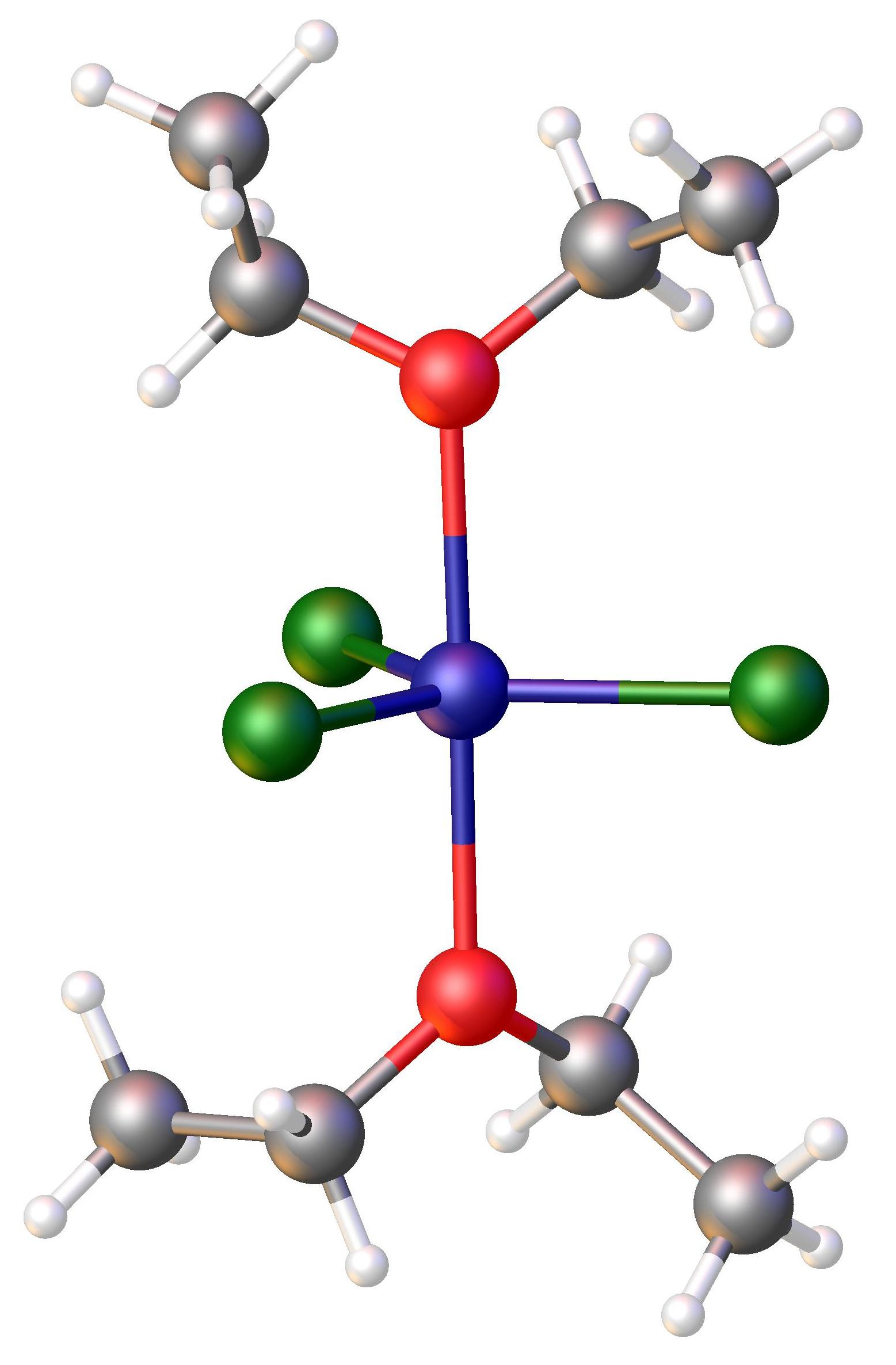
Structure of FeCl_{3}(diethylether)_{2}. Color code: Cl=green, Fe = blue, O = red.

In industry, iron(III) chloride is used as a catalyst for the reaction of ethylene with chlorine, forming ethylene dichloride (1,2-dichloroethane):

H_{2}C=CH_{2} + Cl_{2} → ClCH_{2}CH_{2}Cl

Ethylene dichloride is a commodity chemical, which is mainly used for the industrial production of vinyl chloride, the monomer for making PVC.

Illustrating it use as a Lewis acid, iron(III) chloride catalyses electrophilic aromatic substitution and chlorinations. In this role, its function is similar to that of aluminium chloride. In some cases, mixtures of the two are used.

==== Organic synthesis research ====
Although iron(III) chlorides are seldom used in practical organic synthesis, they have received considerable attention as reagents because they are inexpensive, earth abundant, and relatively nontoxic. Many experiments probe both its redox activity and its Lewis acidity. For example, iron(III) chloride oxidizes naphthols to naphthoquinones:

3-Alkylthiophenes are polymerized to polythiophenes upon treatment with ferric chloride. Iron(III) chloride has been shown to promote C-C coupling reaction.

Several reagents have been developed based on supported iron(III) chloride. On silica gel, the anhydrous salt has been applied to certain dehydration and pinacol-type rearrangement reactions. A similar reagent but moistened induces hydrolysis or epimerization reactions. On alumina, ferric chloride has been shown to accelerate ene reactions.

When pretreated with sodium hydride, iron(III) chloride gives a hydride reducing agent that convert alkenes and ketones into alkanes and alcohols, respectively.

=== Histology ===
Iron(III) chloride is a component of useful stains, such as Carnoy's solution, a histological fixative with many applications. Also, it is used to prepare Verhoeff's stain. Molecules of iron(III) chloride inserted in layers of graphene form GraphExeter, a material developed by the University of Exeter.

== Natural occurrence ==
Like many metal halides, FeCl_{3} naturally occurs as a trace mineral. The rare mineral molysite is usually associated with volcanoes and fumaroles.

FeCl_{3}-based aerosol are produced by a reaction between iron-rich dust and hydrochloric acid from sea salt. This iron salt aerosol causes about 1–5% of naturally occurring oxidization of methane and is thought to have a range of cooling effects; thus, it has been proposed as a catalyst for Atmospheric Methane Removal.

The clouds of Venus are hypothesized to contain approximately 1% FeCl_{3} dissolved in sulfuric acid.

== Safety ==
Iron(III) chlorides are widely used in the treatment of drinking water, so they pose few problems as poisons, at low concentrations. Nonetheless, anhydrous iron(III) chloride, as well as concentrated FeCl_{3} aqueous solution, is highly corrosive, and must be handled using proper protective equipment.
