= Ferric chloride test =

Chemical test for phenols

The ferric chloride test is used to determine the presence of phenols in a given sample or compound (for instance natural phenols in a plant extract). Enols, hydroxamic acids, oximes, and sulfinic acids give positive results as well. The bromine test is useful to confirm the result, although modern spectroscopic techniques (e.g. NMR and IR spectroscopy) are far superior in determining the identity of the unknown. The quantity of total phenols may be spectroscopically determined by the Folin–Ciocalteau assay.

== Technique ==
The sample is dissolved in water, or a mixture of water and ethanol, and a few drops of neutral ferric chloride (FeCl_{3}) solution, which is prepared by adding de-ionised water. Add sodium hydroxide to the mixture until a permanent brown precipitate is formed. The formation of a red, blue, green, or purple coloration indicates the presence of phenols. Where the sample is insoluble in water, it may be dissolved in dichloromethane with a small amount of pyridine.

== Chemistry ==
Phenols form a complex with ferric ions. This complex has an intense colour, which may vary from blue, green or even red depending upon the nature of the phenol. As an example using the chemical phenol itself:

6 PhOH + Fe^{3+} → [Fe(OPh)_{6}]^{3–} + 6H^{+}

== Clinical uses ==
The ferric chloride test can be used to detect metabolites in urine in case of inborn error of metabolism such as phenylketonuria. Compounds such as phenylpyruvate increase in plasma and are excreted out via urine. Also, it can be used to detect salicylates in urine, quick diagnostic test for aspirin overdose.

== See also ==
- Prussian blue assay, a similar test for total phenol determination
