= Iron(II) nitrate =

Chemical compound

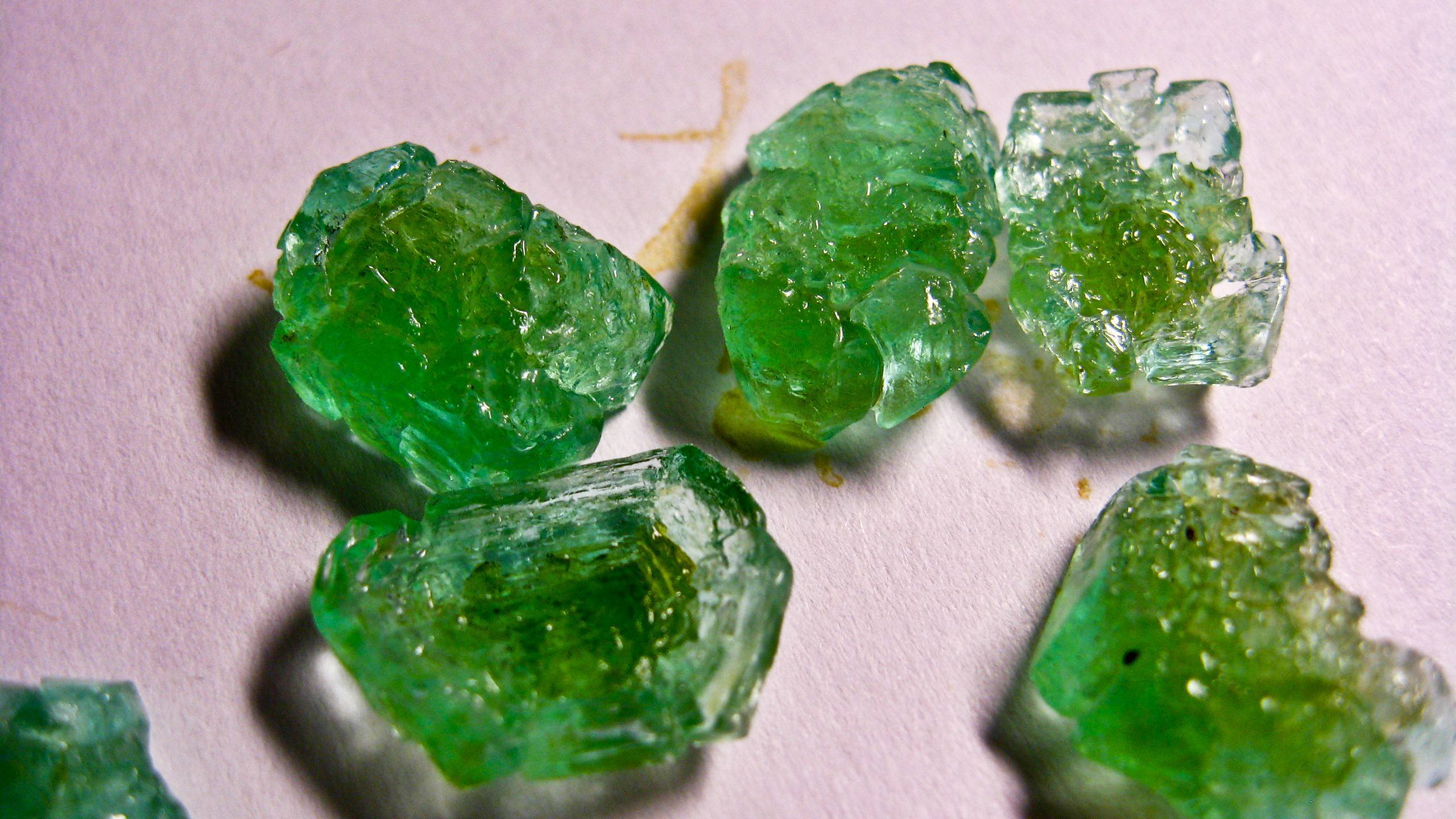
- Hexahydrate

Names
- Other names: Ferrous nitrate

Identifiers
CAS Number	14013-86-6; hexahydrate: 13520-68-8
3D model (JSmol)	Interactive image; hexahydrate: Interactive image; nonahydrate: Interactive image
ChemSpider	7991154; hexahydrate: 24294; nonahydrate: 25942803
ECHA InfoCard	100.299.155
EC Number	233-899-5
PubChem CID	9815404; hexahydrate: 26080; nonahydrate: 129774236
UNII	hexahydrate: TH8VFW48GG
CompTox Dashboard (EPA)	DTXSID70431140
- InChI: Key: MVFCKEFYUDZOCX-UHFFFAOYSA-N; InChI=1S/Fe.2NO3/c;2*2-1(3)4/q+2;2*-1; hexahydrate: InChI=1S/Fe.2NO3.6H2O/c;2*2-1(3)4;;;;;;/h;;;6*1H2/q+2;2*-1;;;;;; Key: SUOTZEJYYPISIE-UHFFFAOYSA-N; nonahydrate: InChI=1S/Fe.2NO3.9H2O/c;2*2-1(3)4;;;;;;;;;/h;;;9*1H2/q+2;2*-1;;;;;;;;; Key: QZRHHEURPZONJU-UHFFFAOYSA-N
- SMILES: [N+](=O)([O-])[O-].[N+](=O)([O-])[O-].[Fe+2]; hexahydrate: [N+](=O)([O-])[O-].[N+](=O)([O-])[O-].O.O.O.O.O.O.[Fe+2]; nonahydrate: [N+](=O)([O-])[O-].[N+](=O)([O-])[O-].O.O.O.O.O.O.O.O.O.[Fe+2]

Properties
Chemical formula	Fe(NO_{3})_{2}
Molar mass	179.86 g/mol
Appearance	Green crystals (hexahydrate)
Melting point	60 °C (140 °F; 333 K) (hexahydrate)
Boiling point	61 °C (142 °F; 334 K) (decomposes)
Solubility in water	87.525 g/100 mL

Structure
Crystal structure	Orthorhombic

Thermochemistry
Std enthalpy of formation (Δ_{f}H^{⦵}_{298})	−497.9 kJ/mol

Hazards
- Lethal dose or concentration (LD, LC)
LD_{50} (median dose)	428 mg/kg (subcutaneous, rabbit)

Related compounds
Other anions	Iron(II) phosphate
Other cations	Manganese(II) nitrate Cobalt(II) nitrate
Related compounds	Iron(III) nitrate
- Except where otherwise noted, data are given for materials in their standard state (at 25 °C [77 °F], 100 kPa). Infobox references

Iron(II) nitrate is the nitrate salt of iron(II). It is commonly encountered as the green hexahydrate, Fe(NO_{3})_{2}·6H_{2}O, which is a metal aquo complex, however it is not commercially available unlike iron(III) nitrate due to its instability to air. The salt is soluble in water and serves as a ready source of ferrous ions.

== Structure ==
No structure of any salt Fe(NO_{3})_{2}·xH_{2}O has been determined by X-ray crystallography. Nonetheless, the nature of the aquo complex [Fe(H_{2}O)_{6}]^{2+} is well known and relatively insensitive to the anion. The Fe-O distances are longer for [Fe(H_{2}O)_{6}]^{2+} (2.13 Å) than for the ferric analogue [Fe(H_{2}O)_{6}]^{3+} (1.99 Å). Both [Fe(H_{2}O)_{6}]^{n+} complexes are high spin, which results in pale colors, paramagnetism, and weak Fe-O bonds.

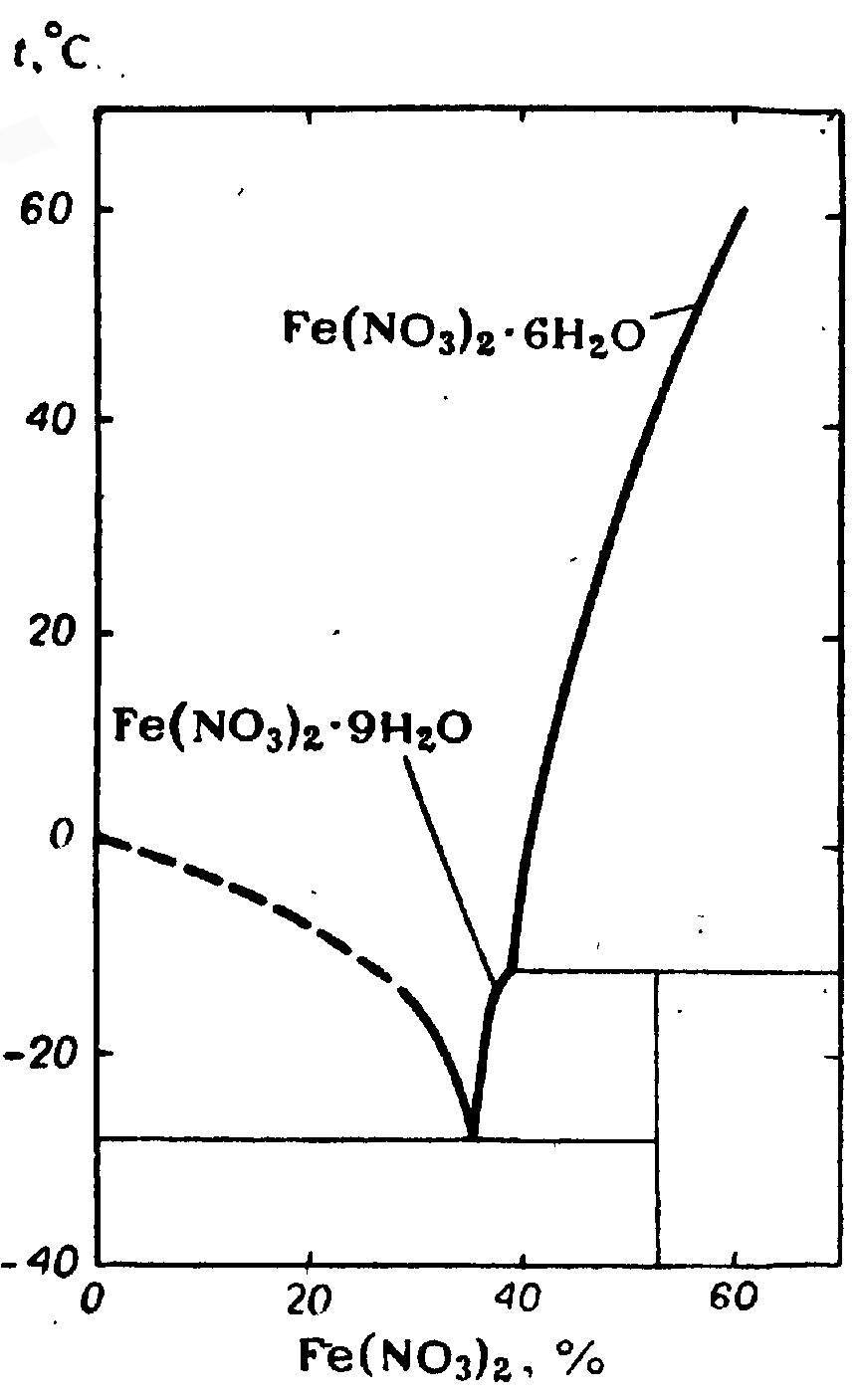
The solubility graph of iron(II) nitrate

== Production ==
Iron(II) nitrate can be produced in multiple ways, such as the reaction of iron metal with cold dilute nitric acid:

3 Fe + 8 HNO_{3} + 12 H_{2}O → 3 Fe(NO_{3})_{2}(H_{2}O)_{6} + 2 NO

If this reaction is conducted below -10 °C, nonahydrate is produced. It readily releases water to give the hexahydrate.

The above reaction can also co-produce ferric nitrate. Reacting iron(II) sulfate and lead nitrate under dilute ethanol and then evaporating the solution leads to the formation of the green crystals of the hexahydrate. A solution of iron(II) nitrate is produced by the ion-exchange reaction of iron(II) sulfate and barium nitrate, producing a concentration of up to 1.5 M due to the limited solubility of barium nitrate.

The solution of the iron(II) nitrate-hydrazine complex is produced by the reaction of hydrazine nitrate and ferric nitrate at 40 °C with copper(II) nitrate as a catalyst:

4 Fe(NO_{3})_{3} + N_{2}H_{5}NO_{3} → 4 Fe(NO_{3})_{2} + N_{2} + 4 HNO_{3}

If the compound is used in situ, the compound is produced by the reaction of iron(II) chloride and calcium nitrate:

FeCl_{2} + Ca(NO_{3})_{2} → Fe(NO_{3})_{2} + CaCl_{2}

== Reactions ==
The hexahydrate melts at 60 °C and then decomposes at 61 °C into iron(III) oxide rather than iron(II) oxide. A solution of iron(II) nitrate is much more stable, decomposing at 107 °C to iron(III), with the presence of nitric acid lowering the decomposition temperature. Concentrated nitric acid oxidizes iron(II) nitrate into iron(III) nitrate:

3 Fe(NO_{3})_{2} + 4 HNO_{3} → 3 Fe(NO_{3})_{3} + NO + 2 H_{2}O

== Uses ==
Iron(II) nitrate has no uses, however, there is a potential use for dye removal.
