= GraphExeter =

Material made of graphene sheets

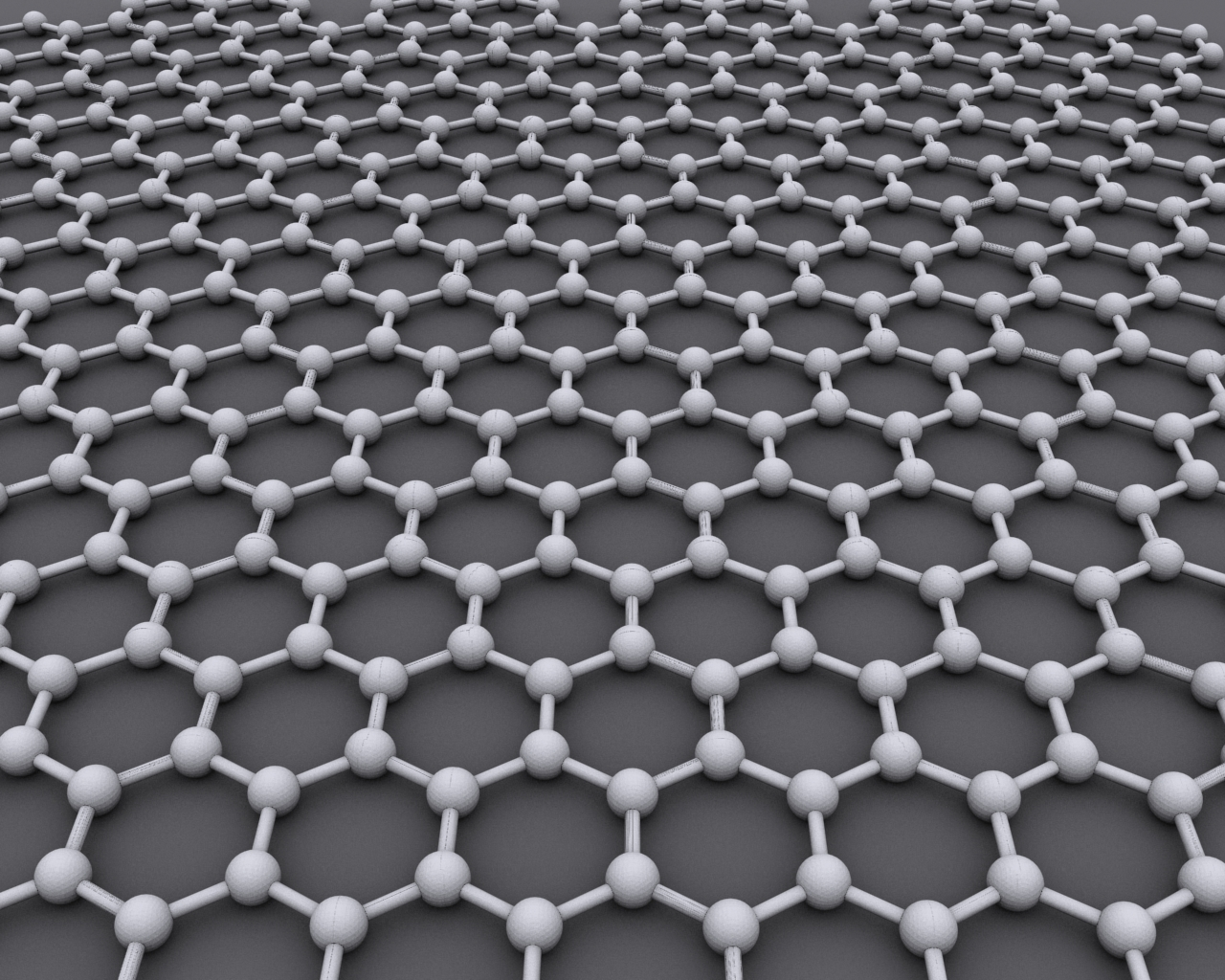
Graphene is an atomic-scale honeycomb lattice made of carbon atoms.

GraphExeter is a material consisting of a few graphene sheets with a layer of ferric chloride molecules in between each graphene sheet. It was created by The Centre for Graphene Science at the University of Exeter in collaboration with the University of Bath.

== See also ==
- Carbon nanotubes
- Graphene nanoribbons
- Graphene oxide paper
