= Iron(II) chloride =

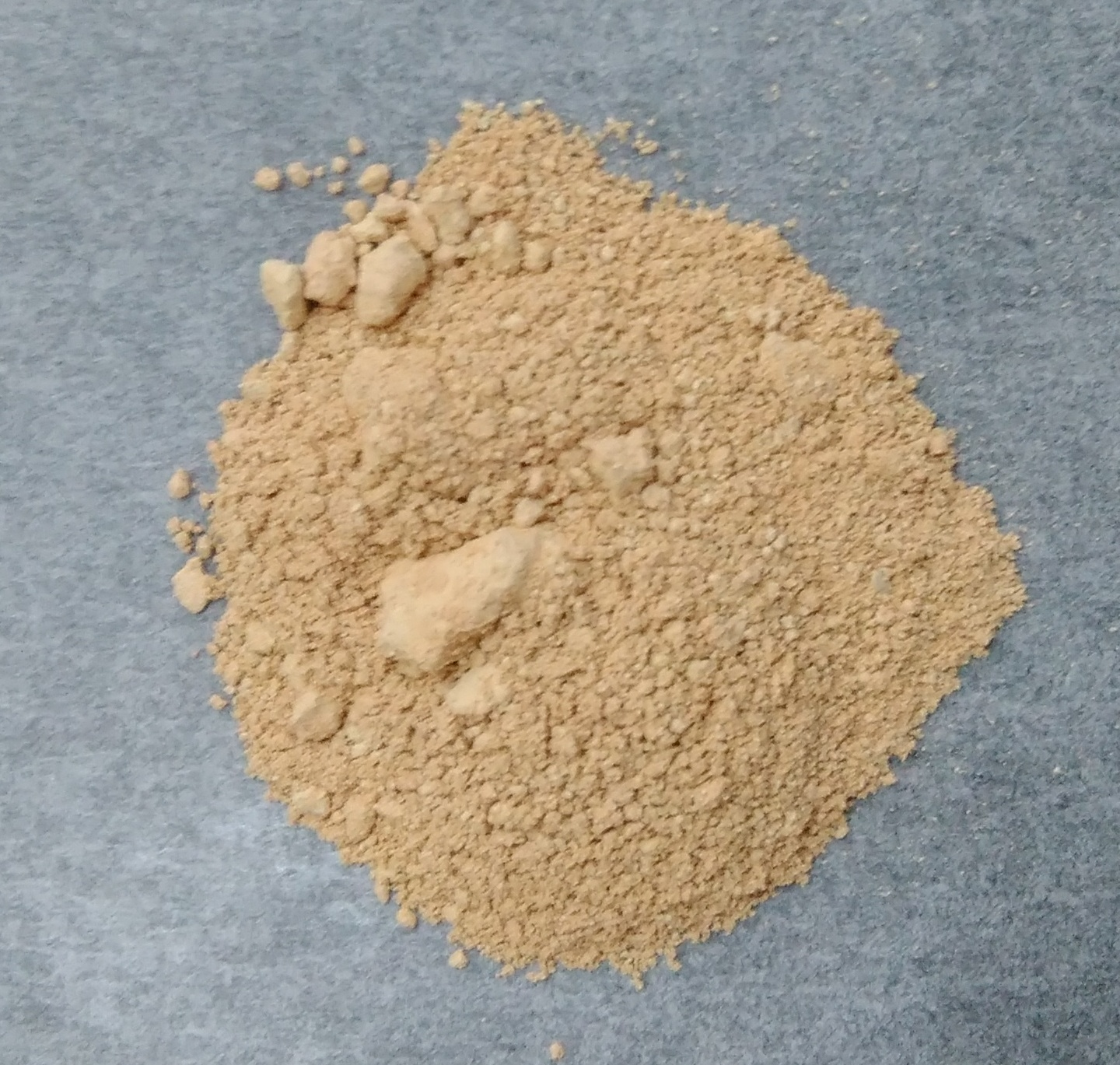
Anhydrous
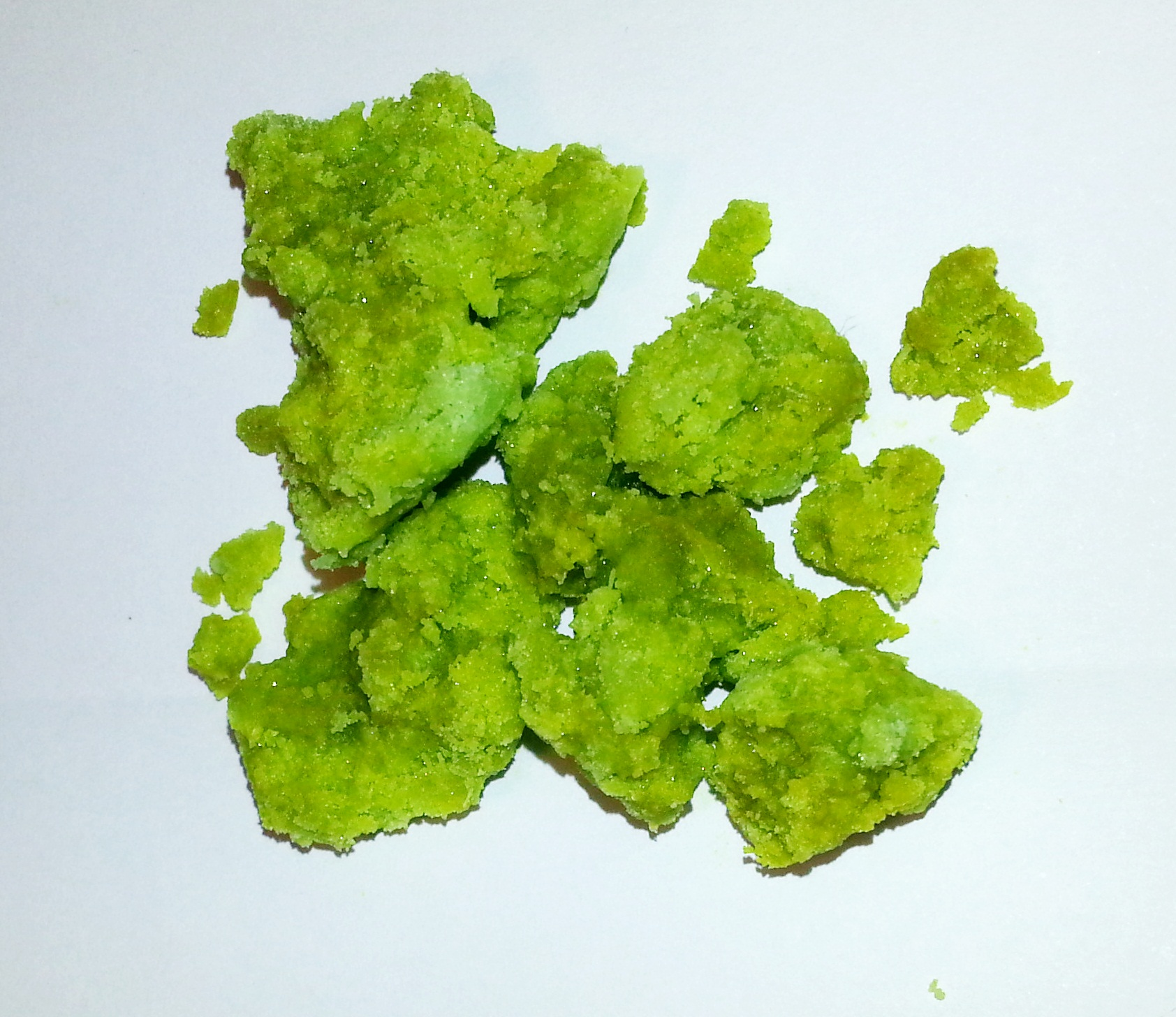
Tetrahydrate
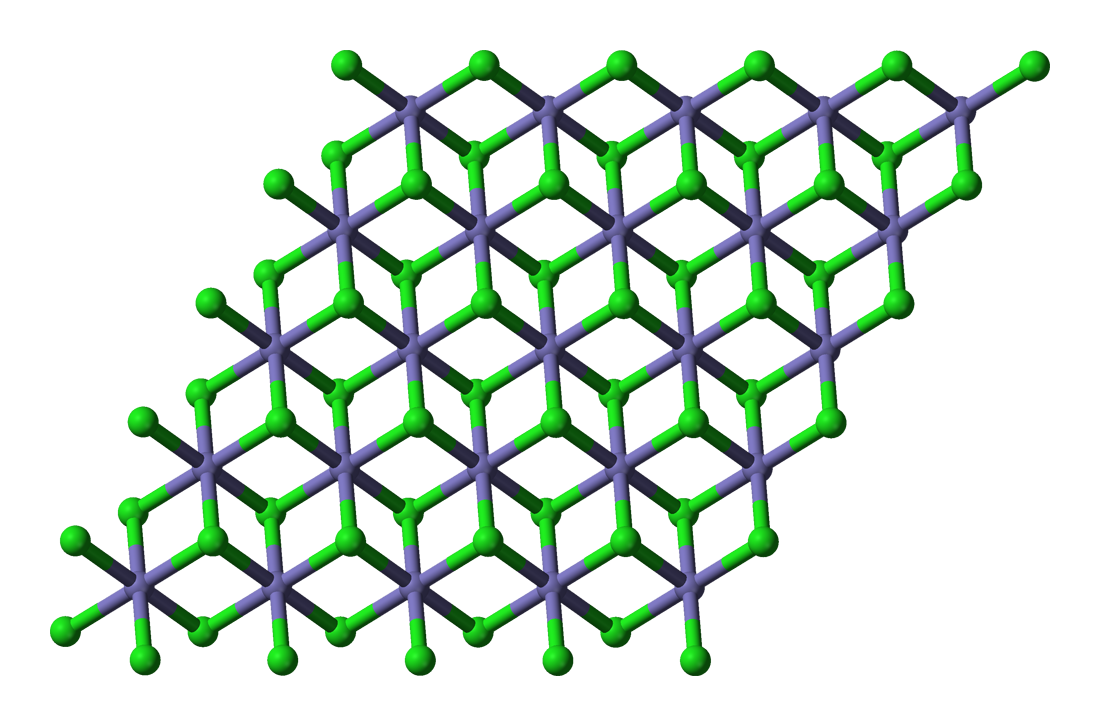
Structure of anhydrous ferrous chloride ( Fe, Cl)
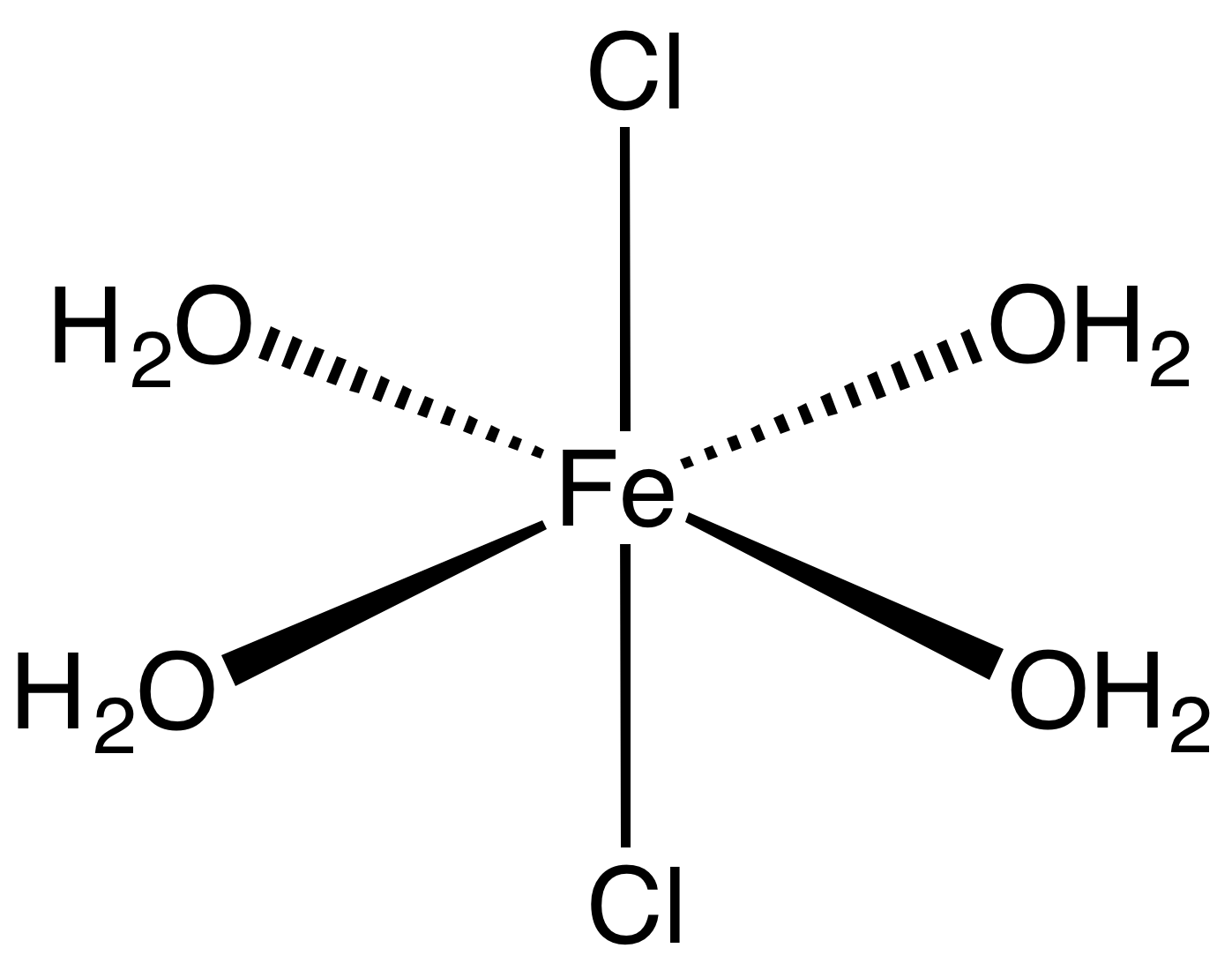
structure of tetrahydrate

Names
- IUPAC names Iron(II) chloride Iron dichloride
- Other names Ferrous chloride Rokühnite

Identifiers
CAS Number	7758-94-3; 16399-77-2 (dihydrate); 13478-10-9 (tetrahydrate)
3D model (JSmol)	anhydrous: Interactive image; tetrahydrate: Interactive image
ChEBI	CHEBI:30812
ChemSpider	22866
ECHA InfoCard	100.028.949
EC Number	231-843-4
PubChem CID	24458
RTECS number	NO5400000
UNII	S3Y25PHP1W
CompTox Dashboard (EPA)	DTXSID9029695
- InChI: InChI=1S/2ClH.Fe/h2*1H;/q;;+2/p-2 Key: NMCUIPGRVMDVDB-UHFFFAOYSA-L; InChI=1/2ClH.Fe/h2*1H;/q;;+2/p-2 Key: NMCUIPGRVMDVDB-NUQVWONBAL
- SMILES: anhydrous: Cl[Fe]Cl; tetrahydrate: Cl[Fe-4](Cl)([OH2+])([OH2+])([OH2+])[OH2+]

Properties
Chemical formula	FeCl_{2}
Molar mass	126.751 g/mol (anhydrous); 198.8102 g/mol (tetrahydrate)
Appearance	Tan solid (anhydrous); Pale green solid (di-tetrahydrate)
Density	3.16 g/cm^{3} (anhydrous); 2.39 g/cm^{3} (dihydrate); 1.93 g/cm^{3} (tetrahydrate)
Melting point	677 °C (1,251 °F; 950 K) (anhydrous); 120 °C (dihydrate); 105 °C (tetrahydrate)
Boiling point	1,023 °C (1,873 °F; 1,296 K) (anhydrous)
Solubility in water	64.4 g/100 mL (10 °C), 68.5 g/100 mL (20 °C), 105.7 g/100 mL (100 °C)
Solubility in THF	Soluble
log P	−0.15
Magnetic susceptibility (χ)	+14750·10^{−6} cm^{3}/mol

Structure
Crystal structure	Monoclinic
Coordination geometry	Octahedral at Fe

Pharmacology
ATC code	B03AA05 (WHO)

Hazards
- GHS labelling
Pictograms	(GHS05: Corrosive) (GHS07: Exclamation mark)
Signal word	Danger
Hazard statements	H290, H302, H315, H317, H318, H412
Precautionary statements	P234, P261, P264, P264+P265, P270, P272, P273, P280, P301+P317, P302+P352, P305+P354+P338, P317, P321, P330, P333+P317, P362+P364, P390, P501
NFPA 704 (fire diamond)	3 0 0
- NIOSH (US health exposure limits)
REL (Recommended)	TWA 1 mg/m^{3}
Safety data sheet (SDS)	Iron (II) chloride MSDS

Related compounds
Other anions	Iron(II) fluoride Iron(II) bromide Iron(II) iodide
Other cations	Cobalt(II) chloride Manganese(II) chloride Copper(II) chloride
- Except where otherwise noted, data are given for materials in their standard state (at 25 °C [77 °F], 100 kPa). verify (what is ?) Infobox references

Iron(II) chloride, also known as ferrous chloride, is the chemical compound of formula FeCl_{2}. It is a paramagnetic solid with a high melting point. The compound is white, but typical samples are often off-white. FeCl_{2} crystallizes from water as the greenish tetrahydrate, which is the form that is most commonly encountered in commerce and the laboratory. There is also a dihydrate. The compound is highly soluble in water, giving pale green solutions.

== Production ==
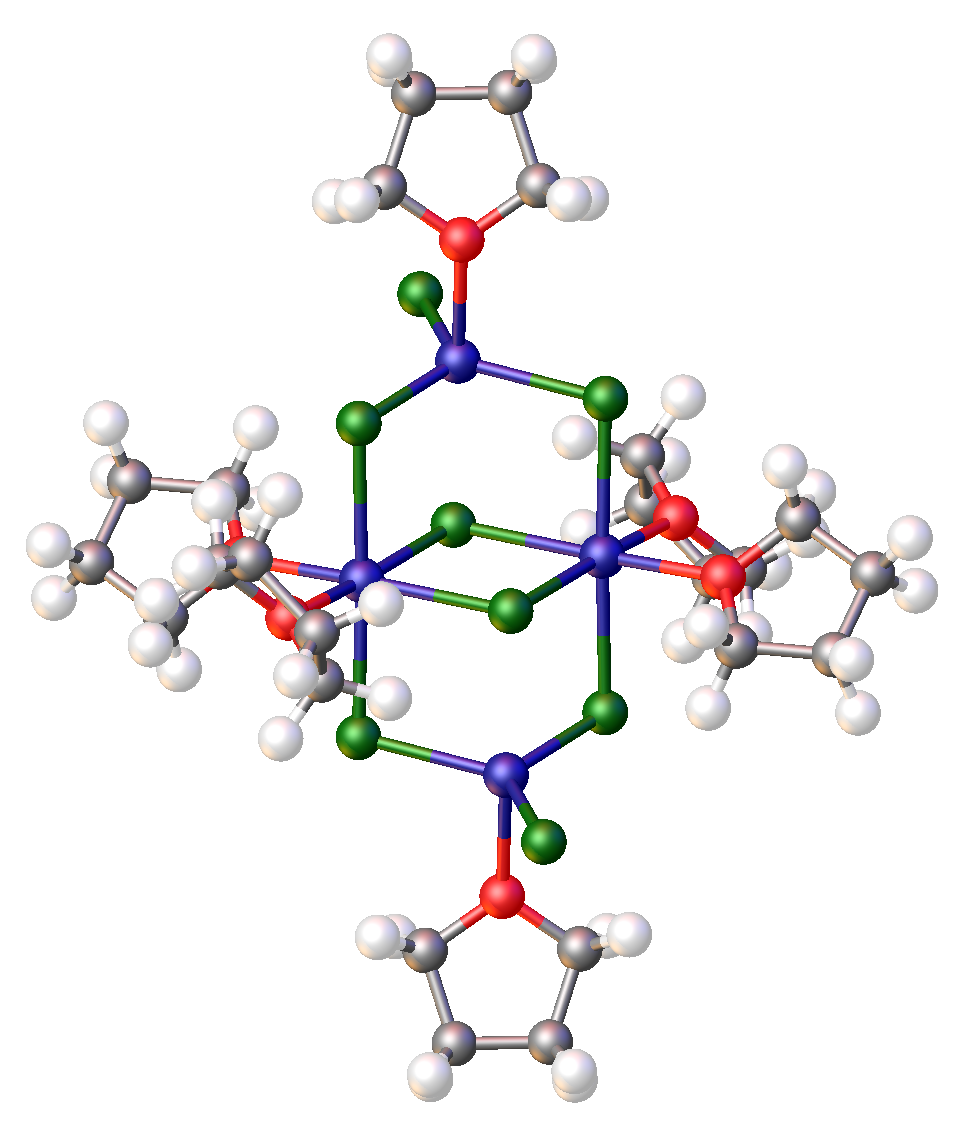
Structure of "FeCl_{2}(thf)_{x}", Fe_{4}Cl_{8}(thf)_{6}, illustrating both tetrahedral and octahedral coordination geometries.

Hydrated forms of ferrous chloride are generated by treatment of wastes from steel production with hydrochloric acid. Such solutions are designated "spent acid," or "pickle liquor" especially when the hydrochloric acid is not completely consumed:

Fe + 2 HCl → FeCl_{2} + H_{2}

The production of ferric chloride involves the use of ferrous chloride. Ferrous chloride is also a byproduct from the production of titanium, since some titanium ores contain iron.

== Anhydrous FeCl_{2} ==
Ferrous chloride is prepared by addition of iron powder to a solution of hydrochloric acid in methanol. This reaction gives the methanol solvate of the dichloride, which upon heating in a vacuum at about 160 °C converts to anhydrous FeCl_{2}. The net reaction is shown:

Fe + 2 HCl → FeCl_{2} + H_{2}

FeBr_{2} and FeI_{2} can be prepared analogously.

An alternative synthesis of anhydrous ferrous chloride is the reduction of FeCl_{3} with chlorobenzene:

2 FeCl_{3} + C_{6}H_{5}Cl → 2 FeCl_{2} + C_{6}H_{4}Cl_{2} + HCl

For the preparation of ferrocene ferrous chloride is generated in situ by comproportionation of FeCl_{3} with iron powder in tetrahydrofuran (THF). Ferric chloride decomposes to ferrous chloride at high temperatures.

== Hydrates ==
The dihydrate, FeCl_{2}(H_{2}O)_{2}, crystallizes from concentrated hydrochloric acid. The dihydrate is a coordination polymer. Each Fe center is coordinated to four doubly bridging chloride ligands. The octahedron is completed by a pair of mutually trans aquo ligands.

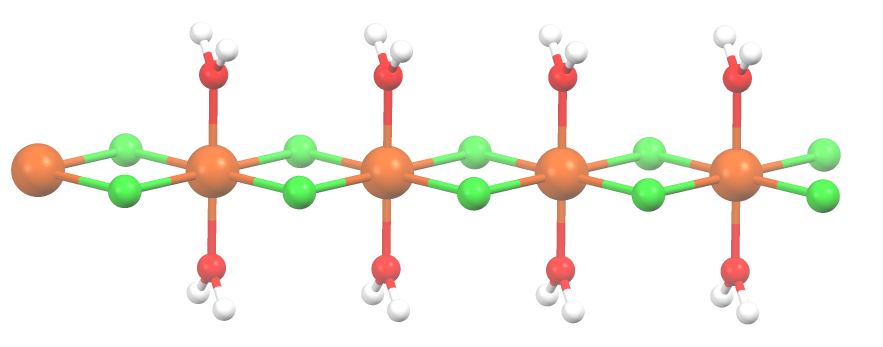
Subunit of FeCl_{2}(H_{2}O)_{2} lattice.

== Reactions ==
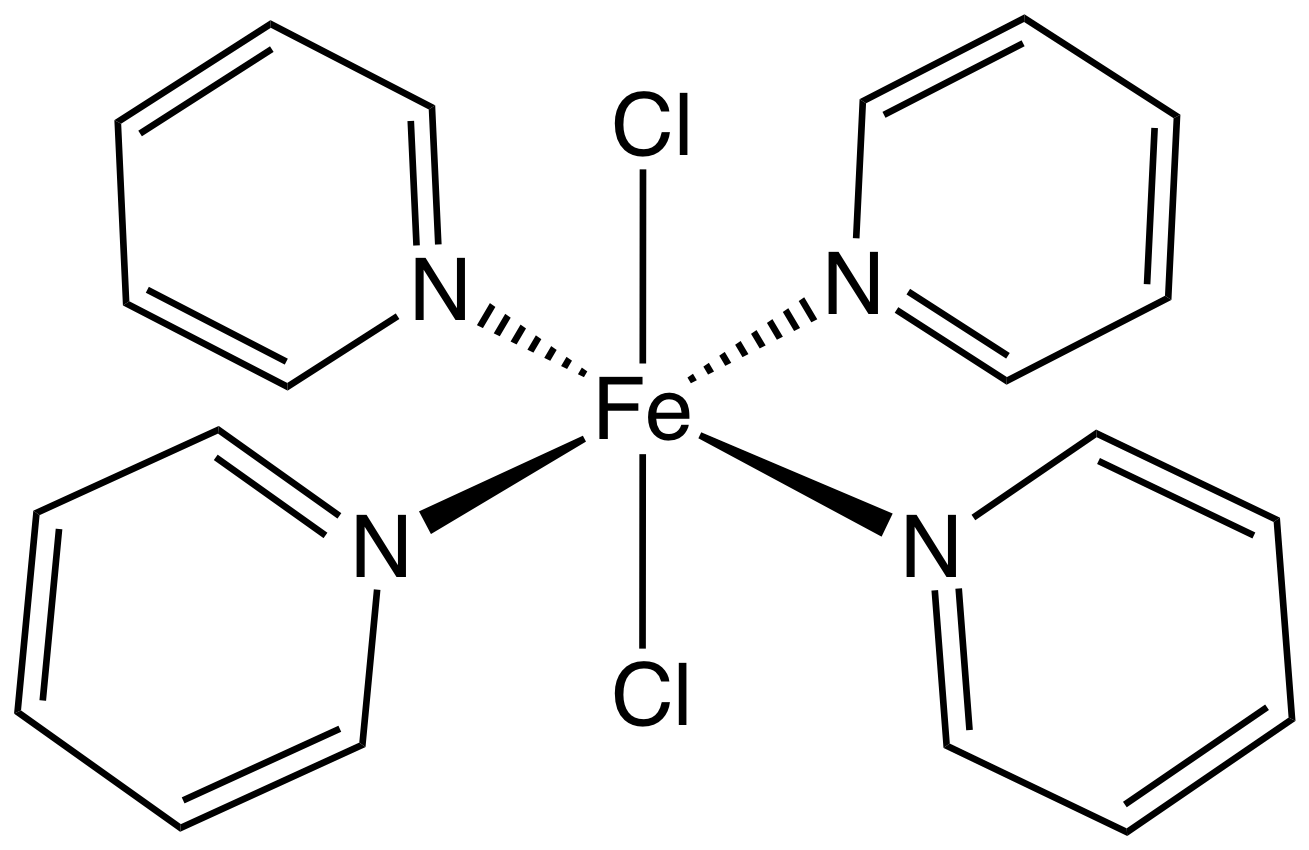
Tetra(pyridine)iron dichloride is prepared by treating ferrous chloride with pyridine.

FeCl_{2} and its hydrates form complexes with many ligands. For example, solutions of the hydrates react with two molar equivalents of [(C_{2}H_{5})_{4}N]Cl to give the salt [(C_{2}H_{5})_{4}N]_{2}[FeCl_{4}].

The anhydrous FeCl_{2}, which is soluble in THF, is a standard precursor in organometallic synthesis. FeCl_{2} is used to generate NHC complexes in situ for cross coupling reactions.

== Applications ==
Unlike the related ferrous sulfate and ferric chloride, ferrous chloride has few commercial applications. Aside from use in the laboratory synthesis of iron complexes, ferrous chloride serves as a coagulation and flocculation agent in wastewater treatment, especially for wastes containing chromate or sulfides. It is used for odor control in wastewater treatment. It is used as a precursor to make various grades of hematite that can be used in a variety of pigments. It is the precursor to hydrated iron(III) oxides that are magnetic pigments. FeCl_{2} finds some use as a reagent in organic synthesis.

== Natural occurrence ==
Lawrencite, (Fe,Ni)Cl_{2}, is the natural counterpart, and a typically (though rarely occurring) meteoritic mineral. The natural form of the dihydrate is rokühnite - a very rare mineral. Related, but more complex (in particular, basic or hydrated) minerals are hibbingite, droninoite and kuliginite.

== See also ==
- Iron(III) chloride
- Iron(II) sulfate
