= Sodium ferrate =

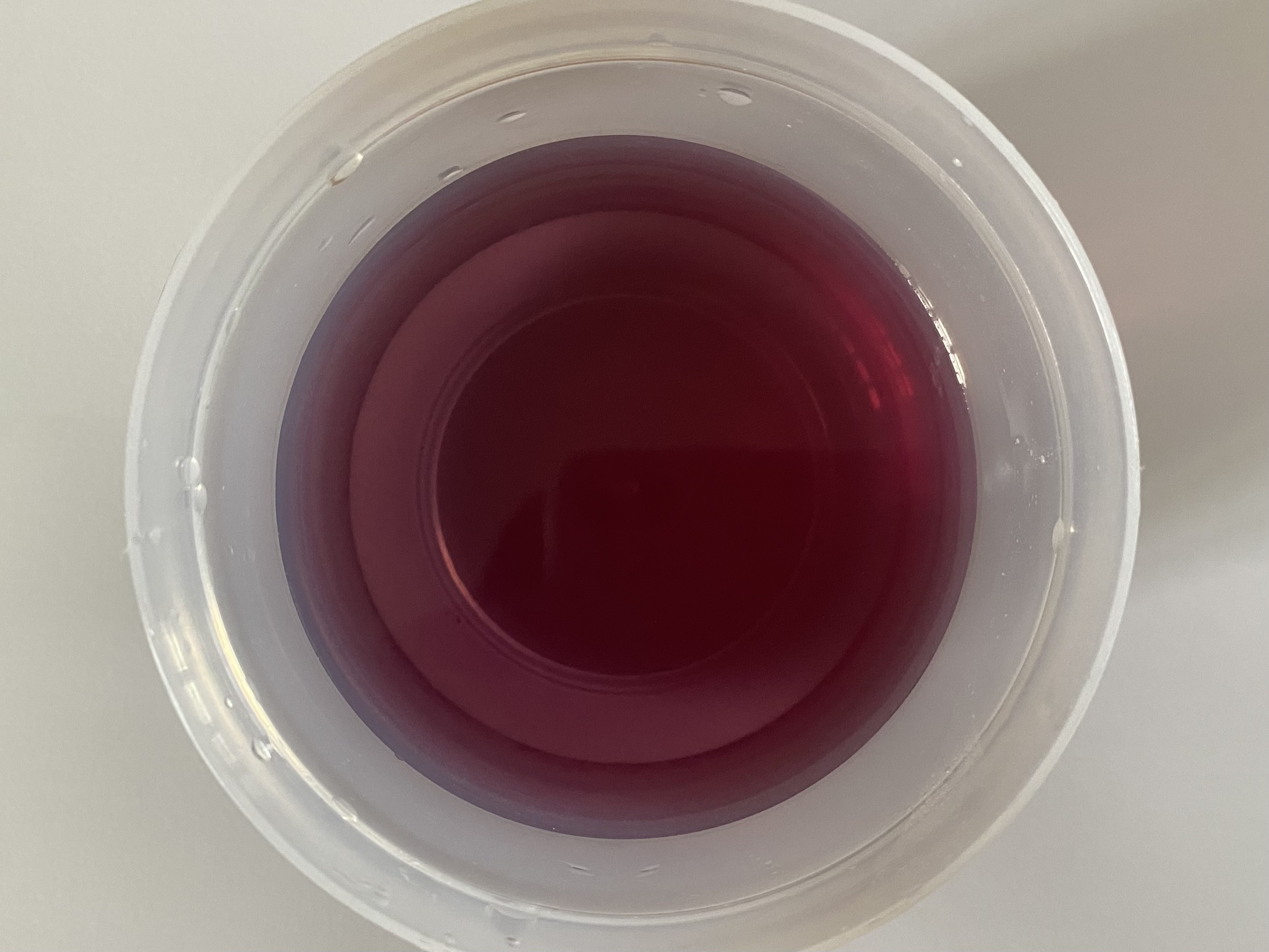

Names
- IUPAC name Sodium ferrate(VI),Sodium Tetraoxoferrate(VI)
- Other names Disodium ferrate

Identifiers
CAS Number	13773-03-0
3D model (JSmol)	Interactive image
ChemSpider	65791467
- InChI: InChI=1S/Fe.2Na.4O/q;2*+1;;;2*-1 Key: MXXNIIPUOAHREZ-UHFFFAOYSA-N
- SMILES: [O-][Fe](=O)(=O)[O-].[Na+].[Na+]

Properties
Chemical formula	Na_{2}FeO_{4}
Molar mass	165.821
Appearance	Red-violet solid
Melting point	Decompose
Boiling point	Decompose
Solubility in water	Soluble

Hazards
- GHS labelling
Pictograms	(GHS03: Oxidizing)

Related compounds
Related compounds	Potassium ferrate Ferrate; Barium ferrate
- Except where otherwise noted, data are given for materials in their standard state (at 25 °C [77 °F], 100 kPa). Infobox references

Sodium ferrate is a chemical compound with the formula Na_{2}FeO_{4}. It is a sodium salt of ferric acid that is very difficult to obtain. In most iron compounds, the metal has an oxidation state of +2 or +3. Ferric acid, with an oxidation state of +6, is extremely unstable and does not exist under normal conditions. Therefore, its salts, such as sodium ferrate, also tend to be unstable. Due to its high oxidation state, FeO_{4}^{2-} is a potent oxidizing agent.

== Properties ==
The physical properties of this compound can be described as similar to those of potassium ferrate: a dark crystalline solid that dissolves in water to form a reddish-violet solution. However, sodium ferrate has less viscosity than potassium ferrate. It is difficult to isolate in the solid state by traditional crystallisation methods, such as precipitation by heating/cooling, vapor diffusion, antisolvent, etc., due to the ease with which it decomposes.

Regarding its chemical properties, sodium ferrate is a very strong oxidant, stronger and more reactive than potassium ferrate. Its redox potential in acid medium reaches 2.2 V, which is stronger than commonly used compounds for water treatment such as ozone (2.08 V), hydrogen peroxide (1.78 V) or potassium permanganate (1.68 V). In addition, it can also act as a coagulant for unwanted pollution compounds in wastewater, causing them to precipitate as large particles without decomposing into toxic compounds.

== Synthesis ==
The synthesis of sodium ferrate(VI) appears to be very delicate due to the instability of ferrate resulting from its high oxidizing power.

The methods to synthesize ferrate(VI) are: thermal, chemical and electrochemical. The thermal method usually requires high temperatures (about 800 °C) and habitually has a low efficiency (50%). The chemical method is multiphase and requires a large number of chemical compounds. The electrochemical method, compared to the other two methods mentioned, has advantages such as the product purity, low solvent demand and the use of an electron which is known as a clean oxidant.

=== Wet chemistry oxidation ===
In this methodology, a solution containing Fe(III) is oxidized in the presence of NaOH and converted to Fe(VI)O_{4}^{2-}. However, this compound degrades rapidly, so additional steps such as "sequestration", washing and drying processes are necessary to obtain a more stable product.

Another drawback encountered with this methodology is related to the isolation and acquisition of the dry product from the corresponding solution, due to the high solubility of Na_{2}FeO_{4} in a saturated NaOH solution. By modifying the production procedure in which chlorine gas is passed through a NaOH-saturated solution of trivalent iron, a dry compound containing 41.38% of Na_{2}FeO_{4} can be obtained.

The wet oxidation method has been extensively used by several researchers to produce solid or liquid ferrate, especially sodium and potassium (VI) ferrate (Na_{2}FeO_{4} and K_{2}FeO_{4}). Generally, it employs: either ferrous (Fe^{II}) or ferric (Fe^{III}) salts as the source of iron ions, calcium, sodium hypochlorite (Ca(ClO)_{2}, NaClO), sodium thiosulfate (Na_{2}S_{2}O_{3}) or chlorine (Cl_{2}) as oxidizing agents and, finally, sodium hydroxide, sodium carbonate (NaOH, NaCO_{3}) or potassium hydroxide (KOH) to increase the pH of the solution.

=== Electrochemistry ===
Electrosynthesis of Na_{2}FeO_{4} in 20M NaOH solution

The electrochemical method requires either the use of an anion dissolved in an electrolysis cell containing a strong alkaline solution (NaOH or KOH) or an inert electrode in an Fe(III) solution with an electric current producing the oxidation of iron to Fe(VI). The basic principle is shown in equations 1-4.

Anode reaction:

Fe^{0}_{(s)} + OH^{−}_{(aq)} → FeO_{4}^{2-}_{(aq)} + 4H_{2}O_{(aq)} + 6e^{−} (1)

Cathode reaction:

3H_{2}O_{(aq)} → H_{2}^{0}_{(g)} + 4H_{2}O_{(aq)} + 6e^{−} (2)

Overall reactions:

Fe^{0}_{(s)} + 2OH^{−}_{(aq)} → FeO_{4}^{2-}_{(aq)} + 3H_{2}^{0}_{(g)} + 4H_{2}O_{(aq)} (3)
FeO_{4}^{2-}_{(aq)} + 2Na^{+}_{(aq)} → Na_{2}FeO_{4(aq)} (4)

The first electrochemical synthesis of ferrate(VI) was carried out around 1841, which is one of the easiest routes to obtain sodium ferrate from solutions without impurities. Later, researchers have performed several experiments in different alkaline environments with various NaOH concentrations, different current densities, temperature, and electrolysis intervals. It was found that increasing temperature could increase the oxidation efficiency, but this behavior is only applicable up to a certain temperature (about 60 °C).

The intensity of the electric current, the material of the anode electrode, and the type and concentration of the electrolyte significantly affect the production of ferrate (VI). Large amounts of carbon in the anode electrode can also increase the efficiency of ferrate (VI) production. Efficiencies above 70% can be achieved using iron or silver electrodes containing 0.9% carbon. The best ferrate (VI) production data have been obtained using a 99.99% pure iron electrode at temperatures around 30 - 60 °C using alternating current (AC).

=== Dry oxidation ===
Currently, two methodologies are known for the dry oxidation of sodium ferrate. The first involves the oxidation of sodium peroxide at 370 °C in the absence of carbon dioxide. The result of this methodology is the production of FeO_{5}^{4-} which immediately hydrolyses to FeO_{4}^{2-} or into tetrahedral ions in solution with water while adopting a red-violet colour as shown in equation 5.

FeO_{5}^{4-}_{(aq)} + 4H_{2}O_{(aq)} → FeO_{4}^{2-}_{(aq)} (5)

The second one is based on heating the remains of the galvanized process together with iron oxide in a furnace with a temperature up to 800 °C. The galvanisation residues and iron oxide in combination with sodium peroxide are melted and immediately cooled to produce sodium ferrate (VI), as illustrated in equation 6 below:

Fe_{2}O_{3(s)} + 3Na_{2}O_{2(s)} → 2Na_{2}FeO_{4(s)} + Na_{2}O_{(s)} (6)

Both methods are dangerous and difficult to handle due to the use of high temperatures and therefore the possible risk of explosions.

== Applications ==
Due to its properties and the fact that it does not generate environmentally toxic by-products, sodium ferrate can be used in the water treatment process. In water treatment it can act as:

- Oxidant agent: promoting the oxidation of organic species in metal complexes.
- Coagulator: allows removal of inorganic pollution compounds such as heavy metals, inorganic salts, trace elements and metal complexes.
- Disinfectant: destroys human pathogens including viruses, spores, bacteria and protozoa.

In addition, sodium ferrate can also remove the colour, odour and oils of polymers and plastics making it a suitable compound for recycling as well as an alternative to traditional processes such as aeration or spreading.

== Handling ==
Sodium ferrate and its decomposition products are non-toxic. However, sodium ferrate in solid state should not be kept in contact with flammable organic compounds.

Sodium ferrate in solid state should be stored in a dark space, without access to air. Ideally, it should be stored in a vacuum or under an inert gas. Its solutions can be handled under normal conditions, but should be stored cold and not for long periods of time.
