= C7H14N2 =

The molecular formula C_{7}H_{14}N_{2} (molar mass: 126.20 g/mol) may refer to:

- Bispidine (3,7-diazabicyclo[3.3.1]nonane)
- N,N'-Diisopropylcarbodiimide
