= High-valent iron =

Iron in an oxidation state higher than III

Ferrate(VI) ion, [FeO_{4}]^{2−}

High-valent iron commonly denotes compounds and intermediates in which iron is found in a formal oxidation state greater than +3 that show a number of bonds above 6 with a coordination number no more than 6. The ferrate(VI) ion [FeO_{4}]^{2−} was the first structure in this class synthesized. The synthetic compounds discussed below contain highly oxidized iron in general, as the concepts are closely related.

== Oxoiron compounds ==
Oxoferryl species are common examples of high-valent iron complexes. Such compounds are prepared by oxidation of ferrous complexes with iodosobenzene:

(mac)FeL_{2} + OIPh → (mac)Fe=O(L) + IPh + L
(mac = tetradentate macrocyclic ligand)

=== Fe(IV)O ===
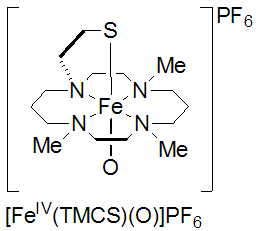
Thiolate-ligated oxoiron(IV)

Several syntheses of oxoiron(IV) species have been reported. The simplest are mixed-metal oxides of the form MFeO_{3}, with M being Ba, Ca, or Sr. However, those compounds do not have discrete iron anions.

Isolated oxoiron(IV) species are known with more complicated ligands. These compounds model biological complexes such as cytochrome P450, NO synthase, and isopenicillin N synthase. Two such reported compounds are thiolate-ligated oxoiron(IV) and cyclam-acetate oxoiron(IV).

Thiolate-ligated oxoiron(IV) is formed by the oxidation of a precursor, [Fe^{II}(TMCS)](PF_{6}) (where TMCS is 1-mercaptoethyl-4,8,11-trimethyl-1,4,8,11-tetraazacyclotetradecane), and 3 to 5 equivalents of H_{2}O_{2} at −60 °C in methanol. The iron(IV) compound is deep blue in color and shows intense absorption features at 460 nm, 570 nm, 850 nm, and 1050 nm. This species Fe^{IV}(=O)(TMCS)^{+} is stable at −60 °C, but decomposition is reported as temperature increases. Compound 2 was identified by Mössbauer spectroscopy, high resolution electrospray ionization mass spectrometry (ESI-MS), X-ray absorption spectroscopy, extended X-ray absorption fine structure (EXAFS), ultraviolet–visible spectroscopy (UV-vis), Fourier-transform infrared spectroscopy (FT-IR), and results were compared to density functional theory (DFT) calculations.

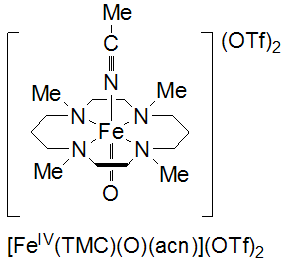
Tetramethylcyclam-supported oxoiron(IV)

Tetramethylcyclam oxoiron(IV) is formed by the reaction of Fe^{II}(TMC)(OTf)_{2}, TMC = 1,4,8,11-tetramethyl-1,4,8,11-tetraazacyclotetradecane; OTf = CF_{3}SO_{3}, with iodosylbenzene (PhIO) in CH_{3}CN at −40 °C. A second method for formation of cyclam oxoiron(IV) is reported as the reaction of Fe^{II}(TMC)(OTf)_{2} with 3 equivalents of H_{2}O_{2} for 3 hours. This species is pale green in color and has an absorption maximum at 820 nm. It is reported to be stable for at least 1 month at −40 °C. It has been characterized by Mössbauer spectroscopy, ESI-MS, EXAFS, UV-vis, Raman spectroscopy, and FT-IR.

High-valent iron bispidine complexes can oxidize cyclohexane to cyclohexanol and cyclohexanone in 35% yield with an alcohol-to-ketone ratio up to 4.

=== Fe(V)O ===
Fe^{V}TAML(=O), where TAML is a tetra-amido macrocyclic ligand, is formed by the reaction of [Fe^{III}(TAML)(H_{2}O)](PPh_{4}) with 2 to 5 equivalents of meta-chloroperbenzoic acid at −60 °C in n-butyronitrile. This deep green compound (two λ_{max} at 445 and 630 nm respectively) is stable at 77 K. The stabilization of Fe(V) is attributed to the strong π-donor capacity of deprotonated amide nitrogens.

=== Fe(VI)O ===
Ferrate(VI) is found in the inorganic anion [FeO_{4}]^{2−}. It has been isolated as the potassium salt, potassium ferrate. It is a strong water-stable oxidizing agent. Its solutions are stable at high pH.

== Nitridoiron and imidoiron compounds ==
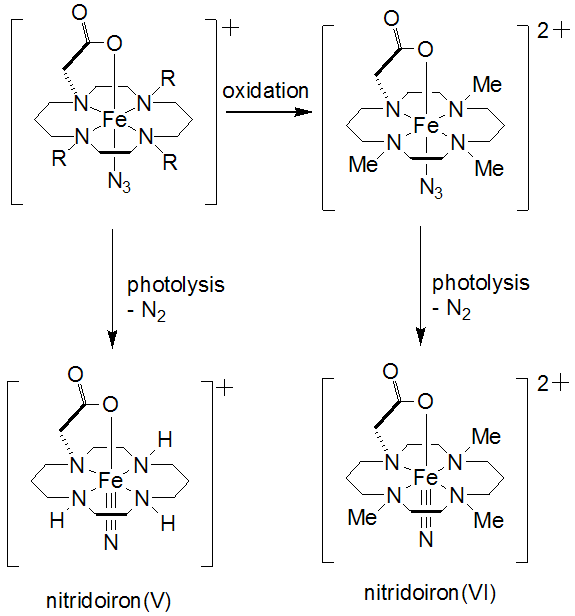
Generation of an nitridoiron(VI) complex

Nitridoiron and imidoiron compounds are closely related to iron-dinitrogen chemistry. The biological significance of nitridoiron(V) porphyrins has been reviewed. A widely applicable method to generate high-valent nitridoiron species is the thermal or photochemical oxidative elimination of molecular nitrogen from an azide complex.

(L)Fe^{n}N_{3} → (L)Fe^{n+2}N + N_{2}
Symbolic oxidative elimination of nitrogen yields a nitridoiron complex; L denotes the supporting ligand.

=== Fe(IV)N ===
Several structurally characterized nitridoiron(IV) compounds exist.

=== Fe(V)N ===
The first nitridoiron(V) compound was synthesised and characterized by Wagner and Nakamoto (1988, 1989) using photolysis and Raman spectroscopy at low temperatures.

=== Fe(VI)N ===
A second Fe^{VI} species apart from the ferrate(VI) ion, [(Me_{3}cy-ac)FeN](PF_{6})_{2}, has been reported. This species, is formed by oxidation followed by photolysis to yield the Fe(VI) species. Characterization of the Fe(VI) complex was done by Mössbauer, EXAFS, IR, and DFT calculations. Unlike the ferrate(VI) ion, compound 5 is diamagnetic.

=== μ-Nitrido compounds and oxidation catalysis ===
Bridged μ-nitrido diiron phthalocyanine compounds such as iron(II) phthalocyanine catalyze the oxidation of methane to methanol, formaldehyde, and formic acid using hydrogen peroxide as sacrificial oxidant.

=== Electronic structure ===
Nitridoiron(IV) and nitridoiron(V) species were first explored theoretically in 2002.

== See also ==
- Jacobsen's catalyst (high-valent manganese)
