= Potassium ferrate =

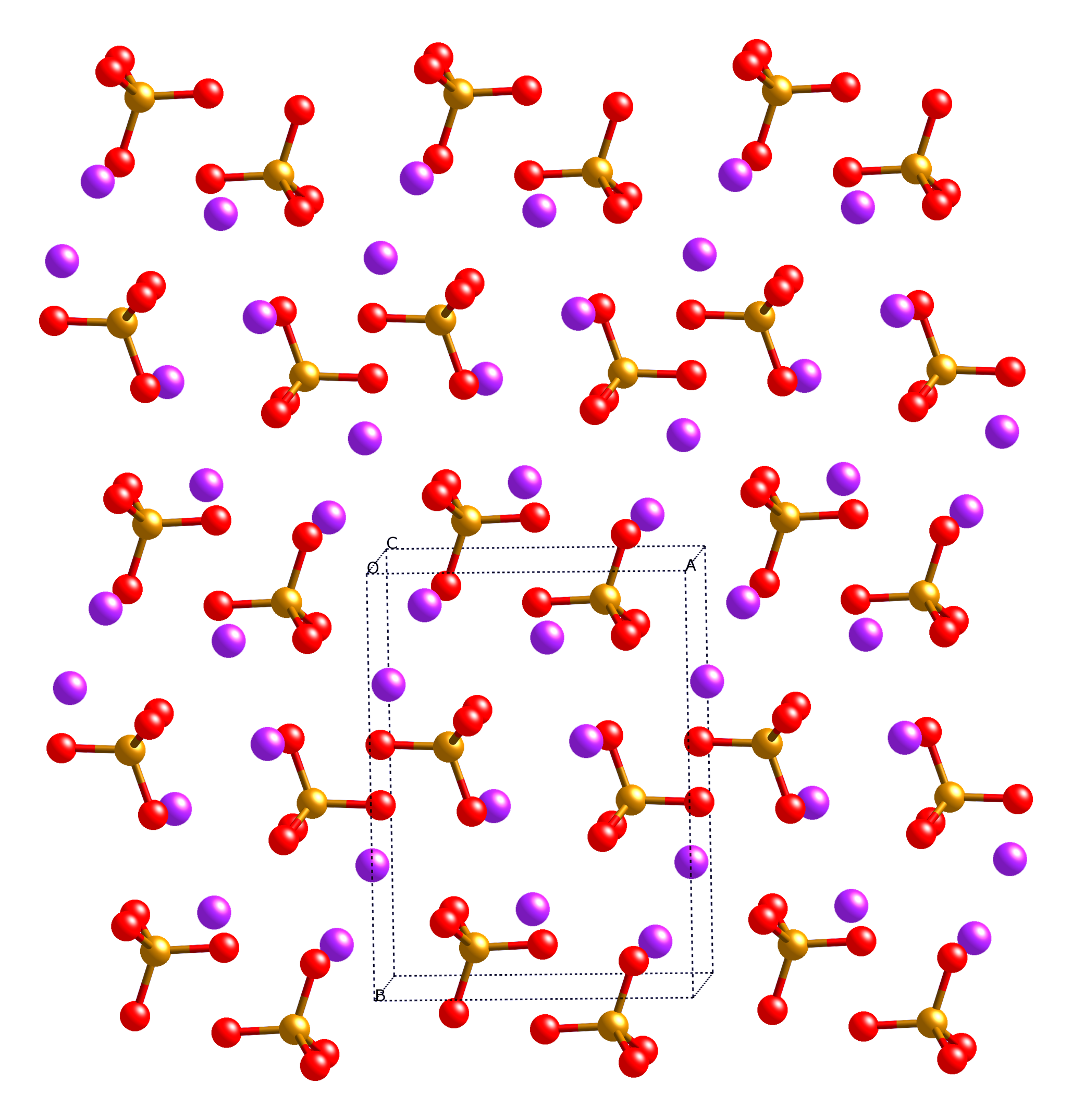

Names
- IUPAC name Potassium ferrate(VI)
- Other names Potassium ferrate Dipotassium ferrate

Identifiers
| CAS Number | 39469-86-8 |
| 3D model (JSmol) | Interactive image |
| ChemSpider | 28296166 |
| PubChem CID | 53493006 |
- InChI: InChI=1S/Fe.2K.4O/q+6;2*+1;4*-2 Key: REKHNDAXGYXSBT-UHFFFAOYSA-N
- SMILES: [K+].[K+].[O-][Fe]([O-])(=O)=O

Properties
| Chemical formula | K_{2}FeO_{4} |
| Molar mass | 198.0392 g/mol |
| Appearance | Dark purple solid |
| Density | 2.829 g/cm^{3} |
| Melting point | >198 °C (decomposes) |
| Solubility in water | soluble in 1M KOH |
| Solubility in other solvents | reacts with most solvents |

Structure
| Crystal structure | K_{2}SO_{4} motif |
| Coordination geometry | Tetrahedral |
| Dipole moment | 0 D |

Hazards
- Occupational safety and health (OHS/OSH)
| Main hazards | Oxidizer |
- GHS labelling
| Pictograms | (GHS03: Oxidizing) |
| Signal word | Danger |
| Hazard statements | H272 |
| Precautionary statements | P210, P220, P221, P280, P370+P378, P501 |
| Flash point | non-combustible |

Related compounds
| Other anions | K_{2}MnO_{4} K_{2}CrO_{4} K_{2}RuO_{4} |
| Other cations | BaFeO_{4} Na_{2}FeO_{4} |
- Except where otherwise noted, data are given for materials in their standard state (at 25 °C [77 °F], 100 kPa). verify (what is ?) Infobox references

Potassium ferrate is an inorganic compound with the formula K_{2}FeO_{4}. It is the potassium salt of ferric acid. Potassium ferrate is a powerful oxidizing agent with applications in green chemistry, organic synthesis, and cathode technology.

== Synthesis ==
Generally, there are three ways to produce hexavalent iron: dry oxidation, wet oxidation, and electrochemical synthesis. The methods used to produce potassium ferrate are similar to those used to produce sodium ferrate and barium ferrate.

=== Dry oxidation ===
The dry oxidation method entails heating or melting iron oxides in an alkaline, oxidizing environment, most commonly created with potassium nitrate or potassium peroxide and potassium hydroxide. The combination of high temperature (200–800 °C) and oxidizing agents presents an explosion hazard that has led many researchers to believe this method of production is not suitable from a safety viewpoint, although many attempts have been made to overcome this problem.

=== Wet oxidation ===
In the wet oxidation method, K_{2}FeO_{4} is prepared by oxidizing an alkaline solution of an iron(III) salt. Generally, this method employs ferric (Fe^{III}) salts such as iron(III) hydroxide as the source of iron ions, an oxidizing agent such as hypochlorite (in the form of Ca(ClO)_{2} or NaClO) or chlorine (Cl_{2}) and a strong alkali such as sodium hydroxide, sodium carbonate (NaOH, Na_{2}CO_{3}) or potassium hydroxide (KOH) to increase the pH of the solution.

=== Electrochemical synthesis ===
Electrochemical methods used to synthesize potassium ferrate usually consist of an iron anode which electrolyzes a KOH solution.

== Properties ==
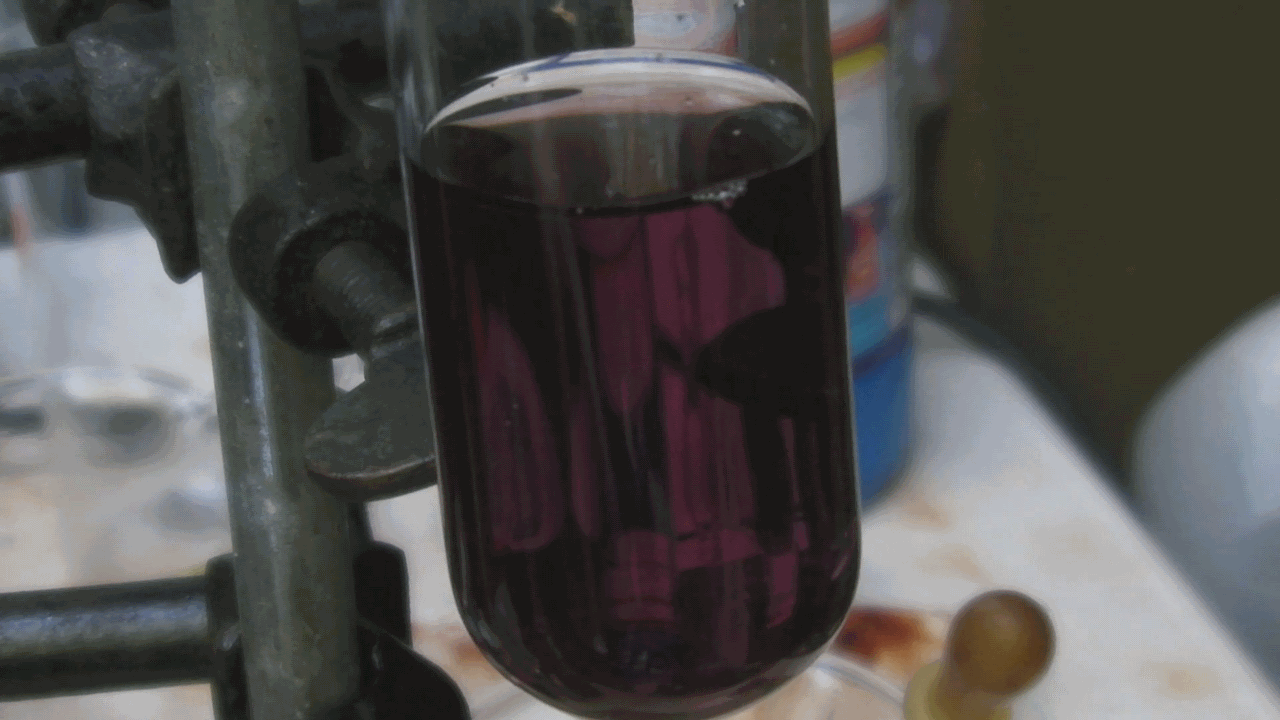
An aqueous solution of potassium ferrate(VI).

Potassium ferrate is a dark purple crystalline solid that dissolves in water to form a reddish-purple solution. The salt is paramagnetic and is isostructural with K_{2}MnO_{4}, K_{2}SO_{4}, and K_{2}CrO_{4}. The solid consists of K^{+} and the tetrahedral FeO^{2−}_{4} anion, with Fe-O distances of 1.66 Å. Potassium ferrate decomposes rapidly in neutral and acidic water, e.g.:

4 K_{2}FeO_{4} + 4 H_{2}O → 3 O_{2} + 2 Fe_{2}O_{3} + 8 KOH

In alkaline solution and as a dry solid, K_{2}FeO_{4} is stable. Under the acidic conditions, the oxidation–reduction potential of the ferrate(VI) ions (2.2 V) is greater than that of ozone (2.0 V).

== Applications ==
Like sodium ferrate, K_{2}FeO_{4} generally does not generate environmentally toxic by-products and can be used in water treatment processes. It can act as:

- Oxidizing agent: promoting the oxidation of organic species in metal complexes.
- Coagulator: allows removal of inorganic pollution compounds such as heavy metals, inorganic salts, trace elements and metal complexes.
- Disinfectant: destroys human pathogens including viruses, spores, bacteria and protozoa.

In addition, potassium ferrate can be used as a bleeding stopper for fresh wounds. In organic synthesis, K_{2}FeO_{4} oxidizes primary alcohols. K_{2}FeO_{4} has also attracted attention as a potential cathode material in a "super iron battery."

Stabilised forms of potassium ferrate have been proposed for the removal of transuranium elements, both dissolved and suspended, from aqueous solutions. Tonnage quantities were proposed to help remediate the effects of the Chernobyl disaster in Ukraine. This new technique was successfully applied for the removal of a broad range of heavy metals. Work on the use of potassium ferrate precipitation of transuranium elements and heavy metals was carried out in the Laboratories of IC Technologies Inc. in partnership with ADC Laboratories, in 1987 through 1992. The removal of the transuranium elements was demonstrated on samples from various Dept. of Energy nuclear sites in the USA.

Because the side products of its redox reactions are rust-like iron oxides, K_{2}FeO_{4} has been described as an "environmentally friendly" oxidant. In contrast, related oxidants such as chromates are considered environmentally hazardous.

== History ==
In 1702, Georg Ernst Stahl (1660 – 1734) observed that the ignition product of potassium nitrate (saltpetre) and iron powder displayed a red-purple color in an aqueous solution, which was eventually attributed to hexavalent potassium ferrate. Eckenberg and Becquerel in 1834 reported that a red-purple color appeared during heating of a mixture of potassium hydroxide and iron ore. In 1840, Edmond Frémy (1814 – 1894) discovered that fusion of potassium hydroxide and iron(III) oxide in air produced a high-capacity iron compound that was soluble in water:

8 KOH + 2 Fe_{2}O_{3} + 3 O_{2} → 4 K_{2}FeO_{4} + 4 H_{2}O
