= Ferrate =

Ferrate loosely refers to a material that can be viewed as containing anionic iron complexes. The term ferrate derives from Latin ferrum 'iron'.

Examples include tetrachloroferrate (FeCl_{4}^{2−}), oxyanions (e.g. FeO_{4}^{2−}), and the organoferrates, including highly reduced tetracarbonylferrate ([Fe(CO)_{4}]^{2−}) salts. Although rarely studied, ferrate(V) FeO_{4}^{3−} and ferrate(IV) FeO_{4}^{4−}) oxyanions of iron also exist. These too are called ferrates.

Ferrates

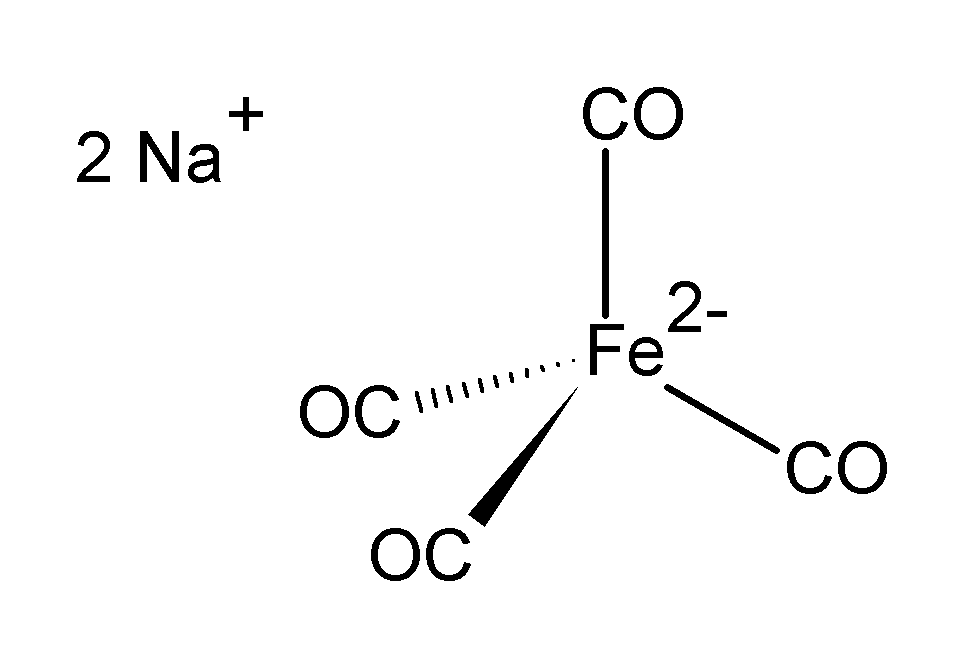
Disodium salt of tetracarbonylferrate

Structure of ferrate(VI), FeO_{4}^{2−})

1-Butyl-3-methylimidazolium salt of FeCl_{4}^{−})

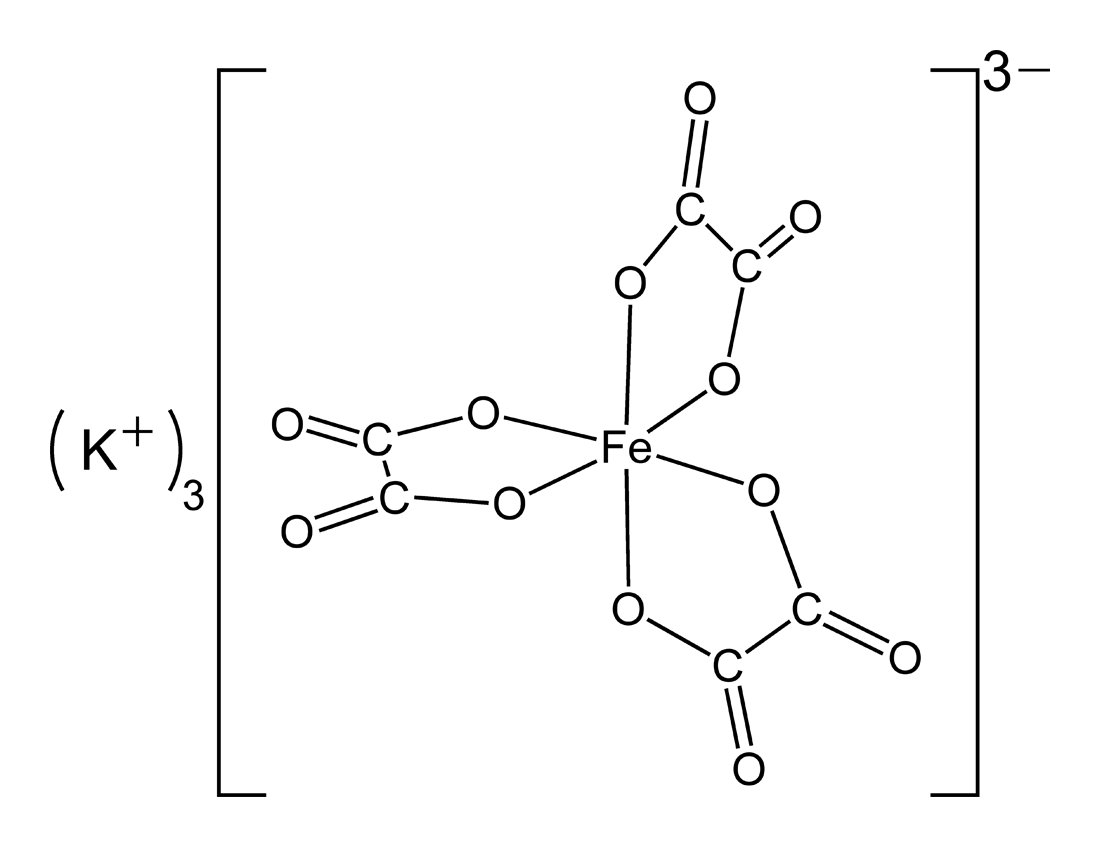
Potassium tris(oxalato)ferrate

Ferrate(VI) is a strong oxidizer, used in water purification and battery technology.
