= Barium ferrate =

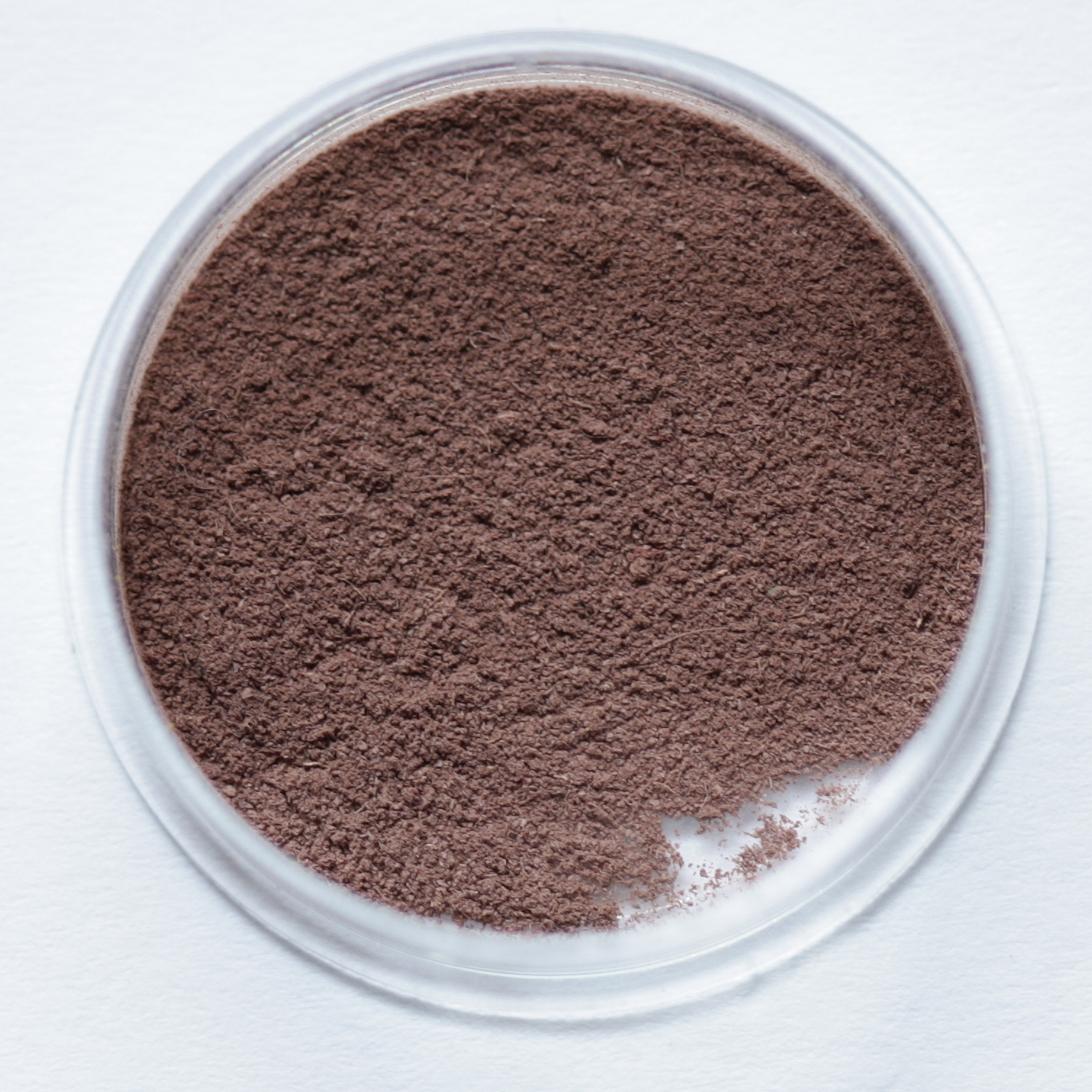

Structural formula of barium(2+)
Wireframe model of aromatised ferrate

Names
- IUPAC name Barium ferrate(VI)
- Other names Barium ferrate(2-)

Identifiers
CAS Number	13773-23-4
3D model (JSmol)	Interactive image
ChemSpider	57448624
PubChem CID	172701188
- InChI: InChI=1S/Ba.Fe.4O/q+2;;;;2*-1 Key: JFTTYFWNHKVEMY-UHFFFAOYSA-N
- SMILES: [Ba++].[O-][Fe]([O-])(=O)=O

Properties
Chemical formula	BaFeO_{4}
Molar mass	257,1646 g/mol
Appearance	Dark red, opaque crystals
Solubility in water	insoluble

Structure
Crystal structure	orthorhombic
Space group	Pnma, No. 62
- Except where otherwise noted, data are given for materials in their standard state (at 25 °C [77 °F], 100 kPa). verify (what is ?) Infobox references

Barium ferrate is the chemical compound of formula BaFeO_{4}. This is a rare compound containing iron in the +6 oxidation state. The ferrate(VI) ion has two unpaired electrons, making it paramagnetic. It is isostructural with BaSO_{4}, and contains the tetrahedral [FeO_{4}]^{2−} anion.

== Structure ==
The ferrate(VI) anion is paramagnetic due to its two unpaired electrons and it has a tetrahedral molecular geometry.

X-ray diffraction has been used to determine the orthorhombic unit cell structure (lattice vectors a ≠ b ≠ c, interaxial angles α=β=γ=90°) of nanocrystalline BaFeO_{4}. It crystallized in the Pnma space group (point group: D_{2h}) with lattice parameters a = 0.8880 nm, b = 0.5512 nm and c = 0.7214 nm. The accuracy of the X-Ray diffraction data has been verified by the lattice fringe intervals from High-Resolution Transmission Electron Microscopy (HRTEM) and cell parameters calculated from Selected Area Diffraction (SAED).

=== Characterization ===
Infrared absorbance peaks of barium ferrate are observed at 870, 812, 780 cm^{−1}.

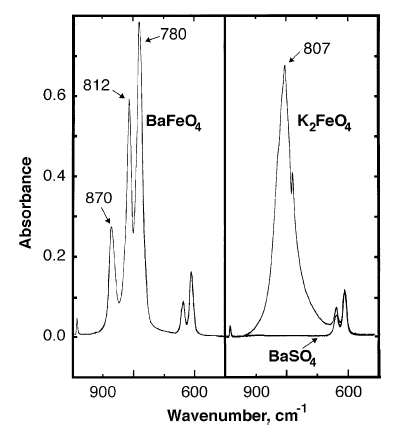
IR Spectrum of BaFeO_{4} showing characteristic peaks

BaFeO_{4} follows the Curie–Weiss law and has a magnetic moment of (2.92 ± 0.03) × 10^{−23} A m^{2} (3.45 ± 0.1 BM) with a Weiss constant of −89 K.

== Preparation and chemistry ==
Barium ferrate(VI) can be prepared by both wet and dry synthetic methods. Dry synthesis is usually performed using a thermal technique, such as by heating barium hydroxide and iron(II) hydroxide in the presence of oxygen to about 800 to 900 °C.

Ba(OH)_{2} + Fe(OH)_{2} + O_{2} → BaFeO_{4} + 2 H_{2}O

Wet methods employ both chemical and electrochemical techniques. For example, the ferrate anion forms when a suitable iron salt is placed in alkaline conditions and a strong oxidising agent, such as sodium hypochlorite, is added.

2 Fe(OH)_{3} + 3 OCl^{−} + 4 OH^{−} → 2 FeO^{2−}_{4} + 5 H_{2}O + 3 Cl^{−}

Barium ferrate is then precipitated from solution by adding a solution of a barium(II) salt. Addition of a soluble barium salt to an alkali metal ferrate solution produces a maroon precipitate of barium ferrate, a crystal which has the same structure as barium chromate and has approximately the same solubility. Barium ferrate has also been prepared by adding barium oxide to a mixture sodium hypochlorite and ferric nitrate at room temperature (or 0 °C). The purity of the product can be improved by carrying out the reaction at low temperature in the absence of carbon dioxide and by rapidly filtering and drying the precipitate, reducing the coprecipitation of barium hydroxide and barium carbonate as impurities.

== Uses ==
Barium ferrate is an oxidizing agent and is used as an oxidizing reagent in organic syntheses. Its other applications include removal of color, removal of cyanide, killing bacteria and contaminated and waste water treatment.

Salts of ferrate(VI) are energetic cathode materials in "super-iron" batteries. Cathodes containing ferrate(VI) compounds are referred to as "super-iron" cathodes due to their highly oxidized iron basis, multiple electron transfer, and high intrinsic energy. Among all ferrate(VI) salts, barium ferrate sustains unusually facile charge transfer, which is important for the high power domain of alkaline batteries.

== Reactions ==
Barium ferrate is the most stable of the ferrate(VI) compounds. It can be prepared in its purest state and has the most definite composition. Barium ferrate can be easily decomposed by all soluble acids, including carbonic acid. If carbon dioxide is passed through water on which hydrated barium ferrate is suspended, barium ferrate will decompose completely to form barium carbonate, ferric hydroxide and oxygen gas. Alkaline sulfates decompose barium ferrate that has not been dried, forming barium sulfate, ferric hydroxide and oxygen gas.

== See also ==
- Potassium ferrate
- Ferrate(VI)
- Barium
