= Ferrate(VI) =

Ion

- Aromatic skeletal formula of ferrate

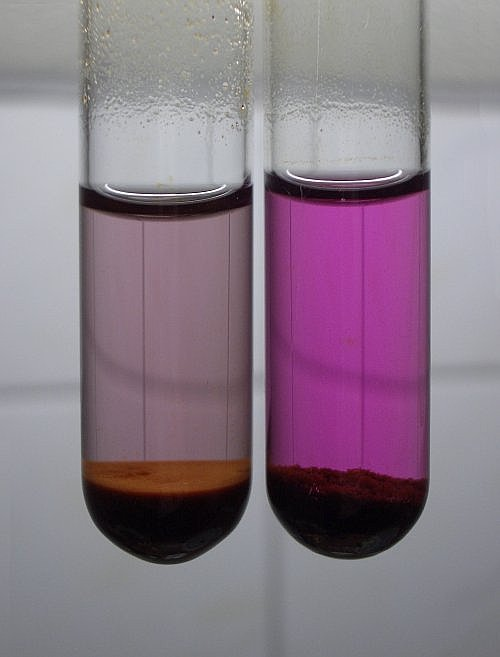
- Solutions of ferrate (left) and permanganate (right)

Names
- IUPAC name Ferrate(VI)
- Systematic IUPAC name Tetraoxidoferrate(VI)
- Other names [FeO_{4}]^{2-}

Identifiers
3D model (JSmol)	Interactive image; Interactive image
ChEBI	CHEBI:30992
ChemSpider	21865127
Gmelin Reference	2055
PubChem CID	25000034
- InChI: InChI=1S/Fe.4O/q;;;2*-1 Key: XGBDPAYTQGQHEW-UHFFFAOYSA-N; InChI=1/Fe.4O/q;;;2*-1/rFeO4/c2-1(3,4)5/q-2 Key: XGBDPAYTQGQHEW-WTZHFVRHAI
- SMILES: [O-][Fe]([O-])(=O)=O; [O-][Fe](=O)(=O)[O-]

Properties
Chemical formula	[FeO_{4}]^{2-}
Molar mass	119.843 g mol^{−1}
- Except where otherwise noted, data are given for materials in their standard state (at 25 °C [77 °F], 100 kPa). verify (what is ?) Infobox references

Ferrate(VI) is the inorganic anion with the chemical formula [FeO_{4}]^{2−}. It is photosensitive, contributes a pale violet colour to compounds and solutions containing it and is one of the strongest water-stable oxidizing species known. Although it is classified as a weak base, concentrated solutions containing ferrate(VI) are corrosive and attack the skin and are only stable at high pH. It is similar to the somewhat more stable permanganate.

== Nomenclature ==
The term ferrate is normally used to mean ferrate(VI), although it can refer to other iron-containing anions, many of which are more commonly encountered than salts of [FeO_{4}]^{2−}.

In battery electrochemistry, ferrate(VI) is sometimes called "super-iron".

== Synthesis ==
Ferrate(VI) salts are formed by oxidizing iron in an aqueous medium with strong oxidizing agents under alkaline conditions, or in the solid state by heating a mixture of iron filings and powdered potassium nitrate.

For example, ferrates are produced by heating iron(III) hydroxide with sodium hypochlorite in alkaline solution:

2 Fe(OH)_{3} + 3 OCl^{−} + 4 OH^{−} → 2 [FeO_{4}]^{2−} + 5 H_{2}O + 3 Cl^{−}

The anion is typically precipitated as the barium(II) salt, forming barium ferrate.

== Properties ==
Fe(VI) is a strong oxidizing agent over the entire pH range, with a reduction potential (Fe(VI)/Fe(III) couple) varying from +2.2 V to +0.7 V versus SHE in acidic and basic media respectively.

[FeO_{4}]^{2−} + 8 H^{+} + 3 e^{−} ⇌ Fe^{3+} + 4 H_{2}O; E_{0} = +2.20 V (acidic medium)
[FeO_{4}]^{2−} + 4 H_{2}O + 3 e^{−} ⇌ Fe(OH)_{3} + 5 OH^{−}; E_{0} = +0.72 V (basic medium)

Because of this, the ferrate(VI) anion is unstable at neutral or acidic pH values, decomposing to iron(III). The reduction goes through intermediate species in which iron has oxidation states +5 and +4. These anions are even more reactive than ferrate(VI). In alkaline conditions ferrates are more stable, lasting for about 8 to 9 hours at pH 8 or 9.

Aqueous solutions of ferrates are pink when dilute, and deep red or purple at higher concentrations. The ferrate ion is a stronger oxidizing agent than permanganate, and oxidizes ammonia to molecular nitrogen.

The ferrate(VI) ion has two unpaired electrons and is thus paramagnetic. It has a tetrahedral molecular geometry, isostructural with the chromate and permanganate ions.

== Applications ==
Ferrate(VI) has been proposed as an environmentally-friendly chemical for water treatment, as its byproduct is essentially rust. Ferrate(VI) is an excellent disinfectant, capable of removing and destroying an living organism, even viruses.

Owing to its instability and the absence of a easy synthesis, ferrate(VI) solutions are impractical for water treatment. In one approach sodium ferrate is produced electrochemically at the point of use by anodic dissolution of iron in concentrated sodium hydroxide. In Russia, such generators have been developed by the Saint Petersburg company Dobrokhim.

== See also ==
- High-valent iron
- Potassium ferrate
- Barium ferrate
