= Bispidine =

Names
- IUPAC name 3,7-diazabicyclo[3.3.1]nonane

Identifiers
CAS Number	280-74-0
3D model (JSmol)	Interactive image
ChEMBL	ChEMBL3094064
ChemSpider	167239
PubChem CID	192720
UNII	CH6VDH22TL
CompTox Dashboard (EPA)	DTXSID90182283
- InChI: InChI=1S/C7H14N2/c1-6-2-8-4-7(1)5-9-3-6/h6-9H,1-5H2 Key: PTPQJKANBKHDPM-UHFFFAOYSA-N
- SMILES: C1C2CNCC1CNC2

Properties
Chemical formula	C_{7}H_{14}N_{2}
Molar mass	126.203 g/mol
Melting point	158-161 °C
Boiling point	190-195 °C (9 Torr)
- Except where otherwise noted, data are given for materials in their standard state (at 25 °C [77 °F], 100 kPa). Infobox references

Bispidine (3,7-diazabicyclo[3.3.1]nonane) is an organic compound that is classified as a bicyclic diamine. Although synthetic, it is related structurally to natural alkaloid sparteine. It is a white crystalline solid. It has been widely investigated as a chelating agent. Many derivatives are known.

== Structure and stereochemistry ==
Bispidine has a bicyclic scaffold consisting of two condensed piperidines. The unsubstituted bispidine backbone can assume three conformations: a chair-chair, boat-chair, and a boat-boat. In the gas phase, the chair-chair conformation predominates

== Synthesis ==
A convenient route to synthesize the bispidine molecule involves a pent-1-en-3-one and a prop-2-en-1-amine leading to a bis(carbethoxyethyl)allylamine which converts in 1-allylpiperidin-4-one by acid hydrolysis and decarboxylation. Then a Mannich reaction occurs, in particular a condensation of a 4-piperidone derivative with paraformaldehyde and allylamine in presence of acetic acid forms N,N’-diallylbispidin-9-one. This latter, results in the final bispidine after treatment with ethyl chloroformate in the presence of NaI, followed by alkaline hydrolysis.

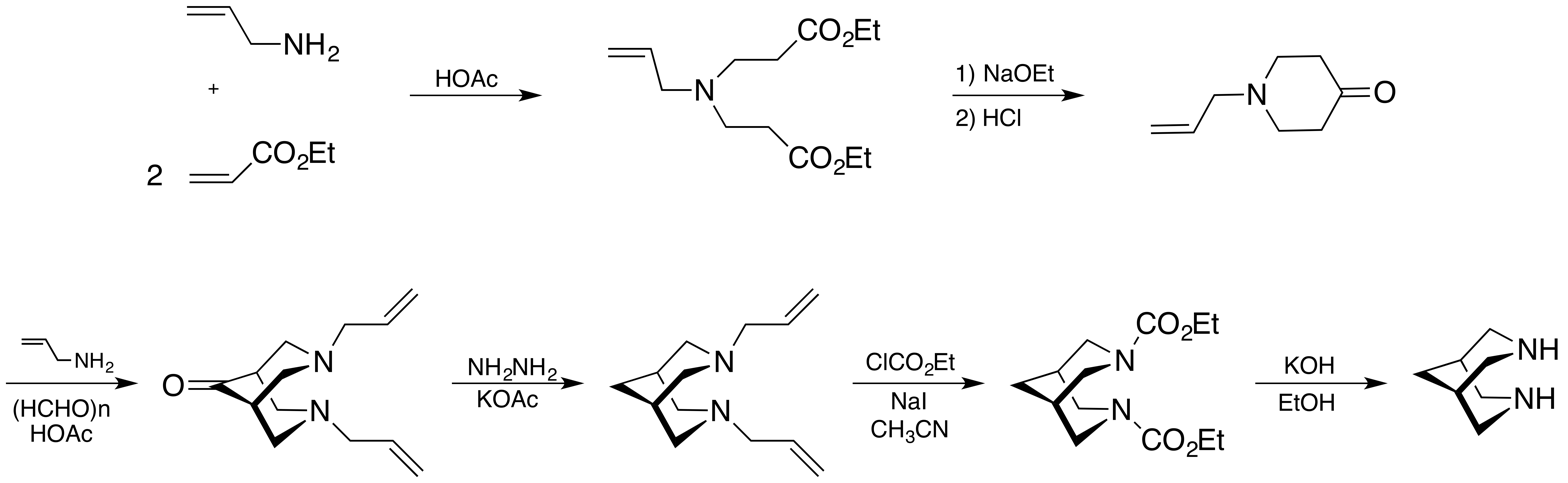
Figure 1. Synthesis of bispidine molecule.

== Reactions ==
Reaction with formaldehyde gives a diazaadamantane.

Figure 2. The reaction

== Bispidine Ligands ==
The bispidine unit can be chemically functionalized in several positions of its rigid bicyclic scaffold leading to a large number of bispidine-type ligands.

=== Synthesis ===
The first bispidine-based ligands dates back to 1930, when Carl Mannich reported the synthesis of two different substituted bispidine molecules. The common route to afford the bispidine derivatives is a variation of the Mannich reaction, in particular two steps are required to afford the final product. The first step includes a reaction between a compound containing acidic C-H hydrogens, an aldehyde and a primary amine, using a predefined molar ratio of 1:2:1, respectively, leading to a piperidone. Additionally, a second condensation between the piperidone, an aliphatic aldehyde and a primary amine, using a ratio of 1:4:2, yields the desired bispidine. The reaction conditions need to be controlled to avoid the competitive aldol reaction. Indeed the reaction solution should be as concentrated as possible to afford maximum yield, using alcohols, THF or other solvents listed in literature. Whereas high temperatures are preferred for one-step condensations, the two-step reaction is generally carried out at 0 °C for the first and refluxed during the second one.

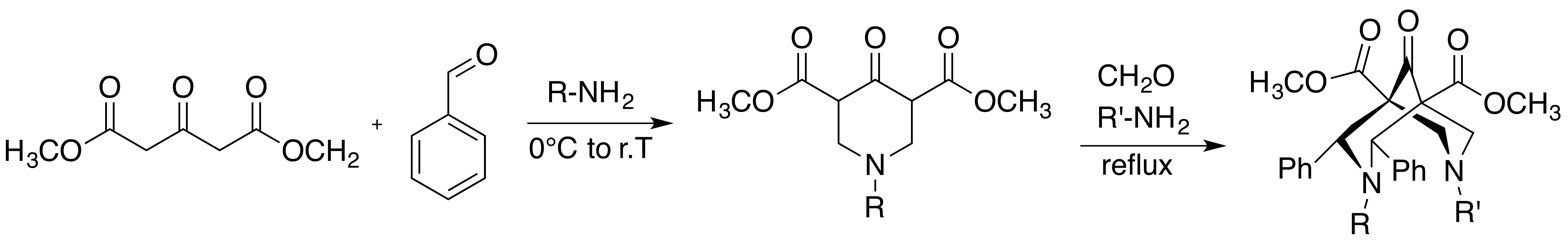
Figure 3. Production of Bispidine-based Ligands.

=== Stereochemistry ===
Chemical substitutions on the bispidine backbone can influence the equilibrium of conformers. Many computational studies and others based on nuclear magnetic resonance (1H and 13C NMR), X-ray crystallography and Raman spectroscopy have been done to investigate the different conformational entities of bispidine derivatives.

=== Coordination Chemistry ===
Bispidine-based ligands have been mostly employed in coordination chemistry. The first transition metal complex with bidentate bispidine dates back to 1957. Indeed, by the addition of further metal binding sites in the basic bispidine scaffold, that has already two aliphatic aminic N donor atoms, efficient stable metal complexes can be selectively synthesized, thus obtaining tetra-, penta-, hexa- and octa- dentate species.

== Potential applications ==
Because of the chemical versatility of the bispidine scaffold and due to the metal selectivity and complexes stability of these types of ligand, they have been proposed for many applications, although none have been commercialized

=== Catalysis ===
Cu(II)-bispidine complexes catalyze aziridations. Amino acids-modified bispidine framework support catalysts for the enantio-selective aldol reaction of functionalized ketones. Bispidine-based iron complexes have been investigated for the oxidation of olefin and unactivated C-H bonds.

=== Pharmaceutical use ===
Several patents relate to the use of bispidine ligands for their antiarrhythmic and analgesic activity. It has been also found out that they exhibit high affinity and selectivity to ĸ-opioid receptors and many studies concerning the influence of structural variation towards their biological activity were also reported.

=== Medicine ===
Bispidine systems were also employed as bifunctional chelators for PET exams. Fast complexation, availability of different functionalities for the linking to the targeting vectors, and a cost-effective way to synthesize them in the multigram scale are among these requirements. The functionalization and optimization of pentadentate bispidine derivatives and the evaluation of the potential of radiocopper−bispidine complexes as PET tracers have been done.

=== Other ===
Bispidine derivatives have been used as ligands to build novel one-dimensional coordination polymers, showing an interesting influence on the dynamic behaviour of these hybrid systems.
