= Noviherbaspirillum soli =

Scientific classification
- Domain: Bacteria
- Kingdom: Pseudomonadati
- Phylum: Pseudomonadota
- Class: Betaproteobacteria
- Order: Burkholderiales
- Family: Oxalobacteraceae
- Genus: Noviherbaspirillum
- Species: N. soli

Binomial name
- Noviherbaspirillum soli (Carro et al. 2012) Lin et al. 2013

Type strain DSM 24276
- CECT 7840, LMG 26149, SUEMI10

Synonyms
- Herbaspirillum soli

Species of bacterium

Noviherbaspirillum soli is a gram negative betaproteobacteria from the genus Noviherbaspirillum which was isolated from an old volcanic mountain soil on Tenerife on the Canary Islands. N. soli was found with Noviherbaspirillum canariense and Noviherbaspirillum aurantiacum together.
