= Collimonas pratensis =

Scientific classification
- Domain: Bacteria
- Kingdom: Pseudomonadati
- Phylum: Pseudomonadota
- Class: Betaproteobacteria
- Order: Burkholderiales
- Family: Oxalobacteraceae
- Genus: Collimonas
- Species: C. pratensis

Binomial name
- Collimonas pratensis Hoppener-Ogawa et al., 2008

Type strain
- CCUG 54728, CTO 91, de Boer Ter91, LMG 23965, strain P24, Ter91, Vandamme R-22721

Species of bacterium

Collimonas pratensis is a bacterium in the Oxalobacteraceae family which was isolated with Collimonas arenae from seminatural grassland soils in the Netherlands. C. pratensis grows in meadow soils.
