= Massilia consociata =

Scientific classification
- Domain: Bacteria
- Kingdom: Pseudomonadati
- Phylum: Pseudomonadota
- Class: Betaproteobacteria
- Order: Burkholderiales
- Family: Oxalobacteraceae
- Genus: Massilia
- Species: M. consociata

Binomial name
- Massilia consociata Kämpfer et al. 2011, sp. nov.

Type strain
- CCM 7792, CCUG 58010

Species of bacterium

Massilia consociata is a Gram-negative, non-spore-forming, rod-shaped bacterium from the genus Massilia and family Oxalobacteraceae, which was isolated from a human clinical specimen. Its 16S rRNA gene sequence has shown that M. consociata belongs to the class Betaproteobacteria and is closely related to Naxibacter varians.
