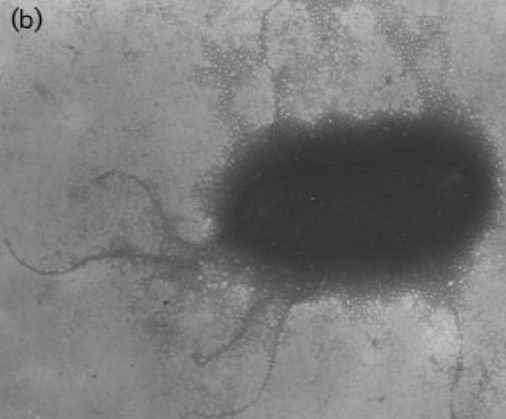

Scientific classification
- Domain: Bacteria
- Kingdom: Pseudomonadati
- Phylum: Pseudomonadota
- Class: Betaproteobacteria
- Order: Burkholderiales
- Family: Oxalobacteraceae
- Genus: Massilia
- Species: M. albidiflava

Binomial name
- Massilia albidiflava Zhang et al. 2006, sp. nov.

Type strain
- 45, CCTCC, AB204071, CCUG 52214, CIP 109189, DSM 17472, KCTC 12343

= Massilia albidiflava =

Species of bacterium

Massilia albidiflava is a Gram-negative, rod-shaped, oxidase and catalase positive, non-spore-forming motile bacterium from the genus Massilia and the family Oxalobacteraceae which was isolated with Massilia dura, Massilia plicata, and Massilia lutea from soil samples in southeast China.
