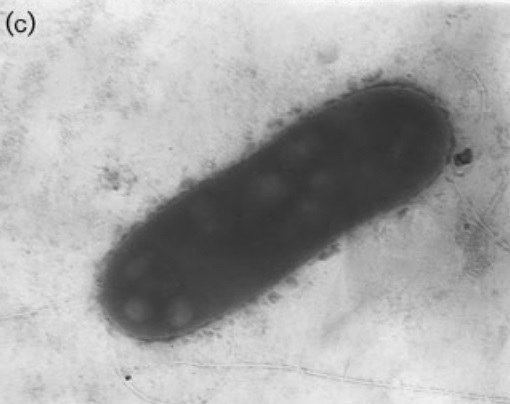
- Massilia plicata

Scientific classification
- Domain: Bacteria
- Kingdom: Pseudomonadati
- Phylum: Pseudomonadota
- Class: Betaproteobacteria
- Order: Burkholderiales
- Family: Oxalobacteraceae
- Genus: Massilia
- Species: M. plicata

Binomial name
- Massilia plicata Zhang et al. 2006, sp. nov.

Type strain
- 76, CCTCC AB204072, CCUG 52215, CIP 109191, DSM 17505, KCTC 12344

= Massilia plicata =

Species of bacterium

Massilia plicata is a Gram-negative, rod-shaped, non-spore-forming, motile bacterium from the genus Massilia and family Oxalobacteraceae, which was isolated with Massilia dura, Massilia albidiflava, and Massilia lutea from soils in China. Colonies of M. plicata are yellow to pale brown.
