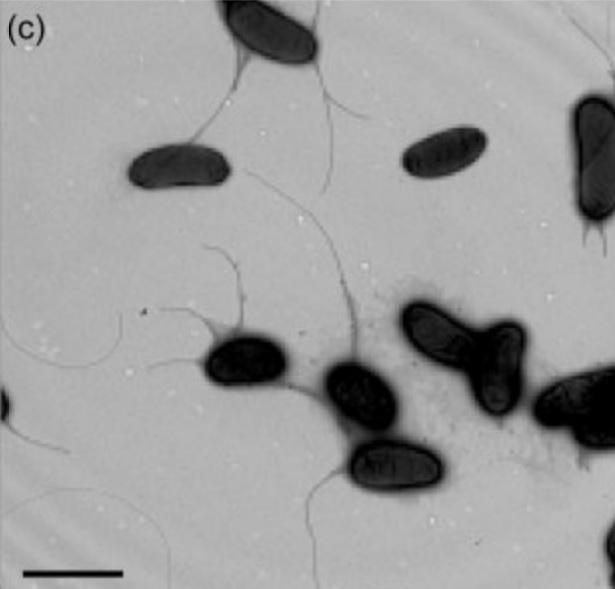

Scientific classification
- Domain: Bacteria
- Kingdom: Pseudomonadati
- Phylum: Pseudomonadota
- Class: Betaproteobacteria
- Order: Burkholderiales
- Family: Oxalobacteraceae
- Genus: Herminiimonas
- Species: H. glaciei

Binomial name
- Herminiimonas glaciei Loveland-Curtze et al., 2009

= Herminiimonas glaciei =

Species of bacterium

Herminiimonas glaciei is a species of ultramicrobacterium in the family Oxalobacteraceae. These small gram-negative cells have a variable number of long flagella at the ends and sides of their rod-shaped bodies. With dimensions of 0.5–0.9 by 0.3–0.4 μm, H. glaciei is roughly 10 to 50 times smaller than Escherichia coli. Discovered in 2009, the species (as strain UMB49^{T}) was isolated from 120,000 years old glacial ice, 3,042 metres (1.9 mi) deep, from Greenland. It was revived after a long-term incubation—seven months of oxygen-free growth at 2 °C, followed by growth on agar plates at 5 °C for almost five months. DNA sequence analysis suggests that with a sequence similarity of 99.6%, H. glaciei is most closely related to H. saxobsidens, a species originally isolated from lichen-colonized rock. Loveland-Curtze, head of the team of scientists from Pennsylvania State University who found the species, speculates that it may offer insight into the existence of organisms in extraterrestrial habitats.

== Description ==
H. glaciei cells are small, gram-negative, thin rods, with dimensions of 0.5–0.9 by 0.3–0.4 μm; the average cell has a volume of 0.043 μm^{3}. They have long flagella, either 1 or 2 at either end of the cell, and may also have 1 to 3 more along the sides. Although the original colony pigmentation is brown-purple, regrowth on agar plates (made using tryptic soy agar with glucose), colonies are circular with an entire edge, convex, smooth, and translucent white to tan colored. This species can grow at temperatures between 1–35 °C, with the optimal growth temperature being 30 °C. At this temperature, the bacteria has a doubling time of four hours when grown in tryptic soy broth without glucose. H. glaciei is resistant to a number of antibiotics: ampicillin, bacitracin, chloramphenicol, ciprofloxacin, penicillin, nalidixic acid, rifampicin, streptomycin and vancomycin. Its growth is inhibited by the antibiotics gentamicin, neomycin and tetracycline.

== See also ==
- Carnobacterium pleistocenium
- Chryseobacterium greenlandensis
