= Glaciimonas singularis =

Scientific classification
- Domain: Bacteria
- Kingdom: Pseudomonadati
- Phylum: Pseudomonadota
- Class: Betaproteobacteria
- Order: Burkholderiales
- Family: Oxalobacteraceae
- Genus: Glaciimonas
- Species: G. singularis

Binomial name
- Glaciimonas singularis Ana Paula Chung, Igor Tiago, M. Fernanda Nobre, Antònio Verìssimo, Paula V. Morais

Type strain
- A2-57, CIP 110539T, LMG 27070T

Species of bacterium

Glaciimonas singularis is a rod-shaped, Gram-negative bacterium species of the genus Glaciimonas which was isolated from a uranium mine wastewater treatment plant. G. singularis grows optimally at 25 °C. Phylogenetic analysis has shown G. singularis belongs to the Oxalobacteraceae family and is very similar to Glaciimonas immobilis.
