= Oxalicibacterium horti =

Scientific classification
- Domain: Bacteria
- Kingdom: Pseudomonadati
- Phylum: Pseudomonadota
- Class: Betaproteobacteria
- Order: Burkholderiales
- Family: Oxalobacteraceae
- Genus: Oxalicibacterium
- Species: O. horti

Binomial name
- Oxalicibacterium horti Sahin et al. 2009, sp. nov.

Type strain
- BCRC 11911, CCRC 11911, DSM 21640, IFO 13594, NBRC 13594, NCIB 8735, NCIMB 8735, OD1

Synonyms
- Pseudomonas sp. (former name)

Species of bacterium

Oxalicibacterium horti is a Gram-negative, rod-shaped, non-spore-forming, yellow-pigmented bacterium from the genus Oxalicibacterium and family Oxalobacteraceae. O. horti uses potassium oxalate as a sole carbon source. Its 16S rRNA gene sequence analysis has shown that it belongs to the order of Betaproteobacteria, most closely to Oxalicibacterium flavum.
