= Naxibacter =

Scientific classification
- Domain: Bacteria
- Kingdom: Pseudomonadati
- Phylum: Pseudomonadota
- Class: Betaproteobacteria
- Order: Burkholderiales
- Family: Oxalobacteraceae
- Genus: Naxibacter; Xu et al. 2005

Species
- Naxibacter alkalitolerans Naxibacter haematophilus Naxibacter suwonensis Naxibacter varians

Genus of bacteria

Naxibacter is a genus of bacteria in the Oxalobacteraceae family.
