= Massilia dura =

Scientific classification
- Domain: Bacteria
- Kingdom: Pseudomonadati
- Phylum: Pseudomonadota
- Class: Betaproteobacteria
- Order: Burkholderiales
- Family: Oxalobacteraceae
- Genus: Massilia
- Species: M. dura

Binomial name
- Massilia dura Zhang et al. 2006, sp. nov

Type strain
- 16, CCTCC AB204070, CCUG 52213, CIP 109188, DSM 17513, KCTC 12342

Species of bacterium

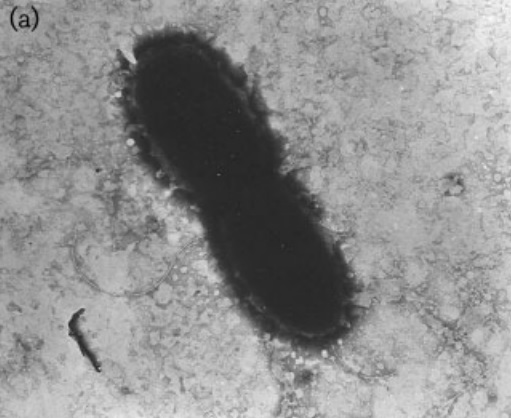
Massilia dura

Massilia dura is a Gram-negative, rod-shaped, non-spore-forming bacterium from the genus Massilia and family Oxalobacteraceae, which was isolated with Massilia albidiflava, Massilia plicata, and Massilia lutea from soil samples collected from southeast China. Colonies of M. dura are hard and compact and their color is pale white to yellow.

== Etymology ==
The specific name dura comes from the Latin dura, which means "hard", because of the nature of the colonies.
