= Massilia cf. timonae =

Scientific classification
- Domain: Bacteria
- Kingdom: Pseudomonadati
- Phylum: Pseudomonadota
- Class: Betaproteobacteria
- Order: Burkholderiales
- Family: Oxalobacteraceae
- Genus: Massilia
- Species: M. cf. timonae

Binomial name
- Massilia cf. timonae

Type strain
- 96A14209

Species of bacterium

Massilia cf. timonae is a Massilia timonae-like, Gram-negative, aerobic bacterium from the genus Massilia and family of Oxalobacteraceae which was isolated from human patients.
