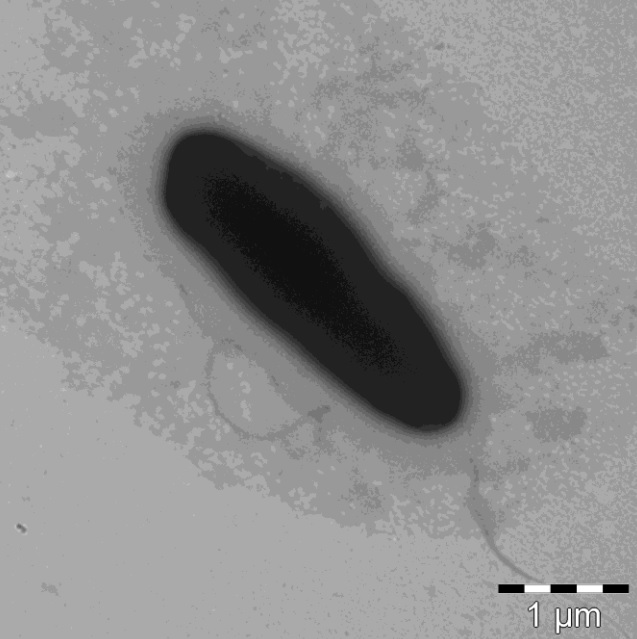

Scientific classification
- Domain: Bacteria
- Kingdom: Pseudomonadati
- Phylum: Pseudomonadota
- Class: Betaproteobacteria
- Order: Burkholderiales
- Family: Oxalobacteraceae
- Genus: Massilia
- Species: M. umbonata

Binomial name
- Massilia umbonata Rodríguez et al. 2014

Type strain
- CECT 7753, DSM 26121, LP01

= Massilia umbonata =

Species of bacterium

Massilia umbonata is a bacterium from the genus Massilia which has been isolated from soil and sewage sludge compost in Jaén in Spain.
