= Massilia niabensis =

Scientific classification
- Domain: Bacteria
- Kingdom: Pseudomonadati
- Phylum: Pseudomonadota
- Class: Betaproteobacteria
- Order: Burkholderiales
- Family: Oxalobacteraceae
- Genus: Massilia
- Species: M. niabensis

Binomial name
- Massilia niabensis Weon et al. 2009, sp. nov.

Type strain
- 5420S-26, CIP 110037, DSM 21312, KACC 12632

Species of bacterium

Massilia niabensis is a Gram-negative, aerobic, motile, rod-shaped bacterium from the genus Massilia and family Oxalobacteraceae, which was isolated with Massilia niastensis from air samples from Suwon in Korea. Colonies of M. niabensis are yellowish white.
