= Undibacterium danionis =

Scientific classification
- Domain: Bacteria
- Kingdom: Pseudomonadati
- Phylum: Pseudomonadota
- Class: Betaproteobacteria
- Order: Burkholderiales
- Family: Oxalobacteraceae
- Genus: Undibacterium
- Species: U. danionis

Binomial name
- Undibacterium danionis Kämpfer et al. 2016

Type strain
- CCM 8677, DSM 102221, strain E3/4

Species of bacterium

Undibacterium danionis is a Gram-negative and rod-shaped bacterium from the genus of Undibacterium which has been isolated from the fish Danio rerio.
