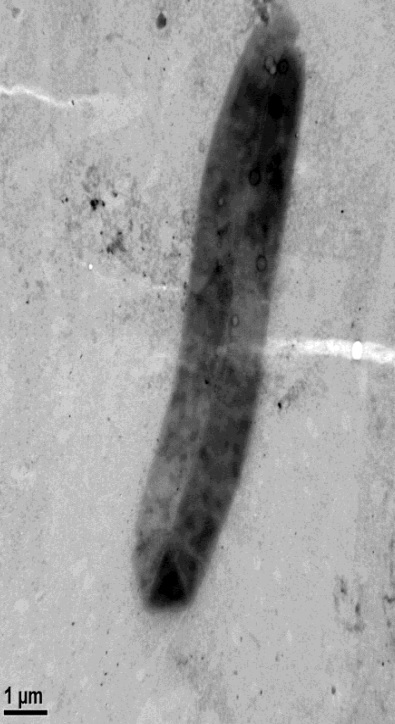

Scientific classification
- Domain: Bacteria
- Kingdom: Pseudomonadati
- Phylum: Pseudomonadota
- Class: Betaproteobacteria
- Order: Burkholderiales
- Family: Oxalobacteraceae
- Genus: Massilia
- Species: M. arvi

Binomial name
- Massilia arvi Singh et al. 2015

Type strain
- CCTCC AB 2015115, KCTC 42609, THG-RS2O

= Massilia arvi =

Species of bacterium

Massilia arvi is a Gram-negative, aerobic and non-motile bacterium from the genus Massilia which has been isolated from soil which was cultivated with Brassica oleracea.
