= Undibacterium pigrum =

Scientific classification
- Domain: Bacteria
- Kingdom: Pseudomonadati
- Phylum: Pseudomonadota
- Class: Betaproteobacteria
- Order: Burkholderiales
- Family: Oxalobacteraceae
- Genus: Undibacterium
- Species: U. pigrum

Binomial name
- Undibacterium pigrum Kämpfer et al. 2007 emend. Eder et al. 2011

Type strain
- CCUG 49009, CIP 109318, CMB NF1b/04, DSM 19792

Species of bacterium

Undibacterium pigrum is a Gram-negative, rod-shaped, oxidase positive, non-spore-forming, and nonmotile bacterium of the genus Undibacterium, which was found in drinking water.
