= Undibacterium parvum =

Scientific classification
- Domain: Bacteria
- Kingdom: Pseudomonadati
- Phylum: Pseudomonadota
- Class: Betaproteobacteria
- Order: Burkholderiales
- Family: Oxalobacteraceae
- Genus: Undibacterium
- Species: U. parvum

Binomial name
- Undibacterium parvum Eder et al. 2011, sp. nov.

Type strain
- CCUG 49012, CIP 109317, CMB NF2a/04, DSM 23061

Species of bacterium

Undibacterium parvum is a Gram-negative, rod-shaped, oxidase positive, non-spore-forming, and low nutrient-loving bacterium of the genus Undibacterium and family Oxalobacteraceae which was found in drinking water.
