= Oligotroph =

Organism that can live in an environment that offers very low levels of nutrients

An oligotroph is an organism that can live in an environment that offers very low levels of nutrients. They may be contrasted with copiotrophs, which prefer nutritionally rich environments. Oligotrophs are characterized by slow growth, low rates of metabolism, and generally low population density. Oligotrophic environments are those that offer little to sustain life. These environments include deep oceanic sediments, caves, glacial and polar ice, deep subsurface soil, aquifers, ocean waters, and leached soils.

Examples of oligotrophic organisms are the cave-dwelling olm; the bacterium "Candidatus Pelagibacter communis", which is the most abundant organism in the ocean (with an estimated 2 × 10^{28} individuals in total); and lichens, with their extremely low metabolic rate.

== Etymology ==
Etymologically, the word "oligotroph" is a combination of the Greek adjective oligos (ὀλίγος) meaning "few" and the adjective trophikos (τροφικός) meaning "feeding".

== Plant adaptations ==
Plant adaptations to oligotrophic soils provide for greater and more efficient nutrient uptake, reduced nutrient consumption, and efficient nutrient storage. Improvements in nutrient uptake are facilitated by root adaptations such as nitrogen-fixing root nodules, mycorrhizae and cluster roots. Consumption is reduced by very slow growth rates, and by efficient use of low-availability nutrients; for example, the use of highly available ions to maintain turgor pressure, with low-availability nutrients reserved for the building of tissues. Despite these adaptations, nutrient requirement typically exceed uptake during the growing season, so many oligotrophic plants have the ability to store nutrients, for example, in trunk tissues, when demand is low, and remobilise them when demand increases.

== Oligotrophic environments ==
Oligotrophs occupy environments where the available nutrients offer little to sustain life. The term "oligotrophic" is commonly used to describe terrestrial and aquatic environments with very low concentrations of nitrates, iron, phosphates, and carbon sources.

Oligotrophs have acquired survival mechanisms that involve the expression of genes during periods of low nutrient conditions, which has allowed them to find success in various environments. Despite the capability to live in low nutrient concentrations, oligotrophs may find difficulty surviving in nutrient-rich environments. The presence of excess nutrients overwhelm oligotrophs' metabolic systems, which cause them to struggle to regulate nutrient uptake. For example, oligotrophs' enzymes function well in low nutrient environments, but struggle in high nutrient environments.

=== Antarctica ===
Antarctic environments offer very little to sustain life as most organisms are not well adapted to live under nutrient-limiting conditions and cold temperatures (lower than 5 °C). As such, these environments display a large abundance of psychrophiles that are well adapted to living in an Antarctic biome. Most oligotrophs live in lakes where water helps support biochemical processes for growth and survival. Below are some documented examples of oligotrophic environments in Antarctica:

Lake Vostok, a freshwater lake which has been isolated from the world beneath 4 km (2.5 mi) of Antarctic ice is frequently held to be a primary example of an oligotrophic environment. Analysis of ice samples showed ecologically separated microenvironments. Isolation of microorganisms from each microenvironment led to the discovery of a wide range of different microorganisms present within the ice sheet. Traces of fungi have also been observed which suggests potential for unique symbiotic interactions. The lake’s extensive oligotrophy has led some to believe parts of the lake are completely sterile. This lake is a helpful tool for simulating studies regarding extraterrestrial life on frozen planets and other celestial bodies.

Crooked Lake is an ultra-oligotrophic glacial lake with a thin distribution of heterotrophic and autotrophic microorganisms. The microbial loop plays a big role in cycling nutrients and energy within this lake, despite particularly low bacterial abundance and productivity in these environments. The little ecological diversity can be attributed to the lake's low annual temperatures. Species discovered in this lake include Ochromonas, Chlamydomonas, Scourfeldia, Cryptomonas, Akistrodesmus falcatus, and Daphniopsis studeri (a microcrustacean). It is proposed that low competitive selection against Daphniopsis studeri has allowed the species to survive long enough to reproduce in nutrient limiting environments.

=== Australia ===
The sandplains and lateritic soils of southern Western Australia, where an extremely thick craton has precluded any geological activity since the Cambrian and there has been no glaciation to renew soils since the Carboniferous. Thus, soils are extremely nutrient-poor and most vegetation must use strategies such as cluster roots to gain even the smallest quantities of such nutrients as phosphorus and sulfur.

The vegetation in these regions displays high levels of biodiversity, which can be comparable to a tropical rainforest in certain locations, and it and produces many species of wildflowers. However, this ecosystem is severely threatened by climate change which has moved the winter rain belt south, and also by clearing for agriculture and through use of fertilizers, which is primarily driven by low land costs which make farming economic even with yields a fraction of those in Europe or North America.

=== South America ===
An example of oligotrophic soils are those on white-sands, with soil pH lower than 5.0, on the Rio Negro basin on northern Amazonia that house very low-diversity, extremely fragile forests and savannahs drained by blackwater rivers; dark water colour due to high concentration of tannins, humic acids and other organic compounds derived from the very slow decomposition of plant matter. Similar forests are found in the oligotrophic waters of the Patía River delta on the Pacific side of the Andes.

=== Ocean ===
In the ocean, the subtropical gyres north and south of the equator are regions in which the nutrients required for phytoplankton growth (for instance, nitrate, phosphate and silicic acid) are strongly depleted all year round. These areas are described as oligotrophic and exhibit low surface chlorophyll. They are occasionally described as "ocean deserts".

=== Oligotrophic soil environments ===
The oligotrophic soil environments include agricultural soil, frozen soil, et cetera. Various factors, such as decomposition, soil structure, fertilization and temperature, can affect the nutrient-availability in the soil environments.

Generally, the nutrient becomes less available along the depth of the soil environment, because on the surface, the organic compounds decomposed from the plant and animal debris are consumed quickly by other microbes, resulting in the lack of nutrient in the deeper level of soil. In addition, the metabolic waste produced by the microorganisms on the surface also causes the accumulation of toxic chemicals in the deeper area. Furthermore, oxygen and water are important for some metabolic pathways, but it is difficult for water and oxygen to diffuse as the depth increases. Some factors such as: soil aggregates, pores and extracellular enzymes, may help water, oxygen and other nutrients diffuse into the soil. Moreover, the presence of mineral under the soil provides the alternative sources for the species living in the oligotrophic soil. In terms of the agricultural lands, the application of fertilizer has a complicated impact on the source of carbon, either increasing or decreasing the organic carbon in the soil.

Collimonas is one of the genera that are capable of living in the oligotrophic soil. One common feature of the environments where Collimonas lives is the presence of fungi, because Collimonas have the ability of not only hydrolyzing the chitin produced by fungi for nutrients, but also producing materials (e.g., P. fluorescens 2-79) to protect themselves from fungal infection. The mutual relationship is common in the oligotrophic environments. Additionally, Collimonas can also obtain electron sources from rocks and minerals by weathering.

In terms of polar areas, such as Antarctic and Arctic region, the soil environment is considered as oligotrophic because the soil is frozen with low biological activities. The most abundant species in the frozen soil are Actinomycetota, Pseudomonadota, Acidobacteriota and Cyanobacteria, together with a small amount of archaea and fungi. Actinomycetota can maintain the activity of their metabolic enzymes and continue their biochemical reactions under a wide range of low temperature. In addition, the DNA repairing machinery in Actinomycetota protects them from lethal DNA mutation at low temperature.

== See also ==
- Oligotrophic lake
- Eutrophic lake
- Pelagibacter ubique, most abundant species on Earth and a streamlined oligotroph
