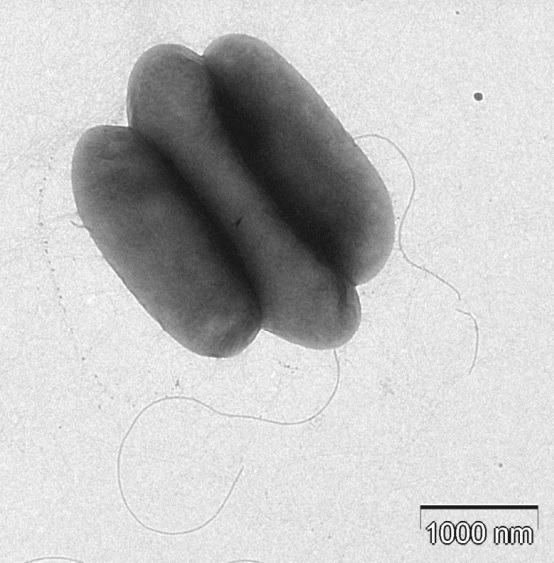

Scientific classification
- Domain: Bacteria
- Kingdom: Pseudomonadati
- Phylum: Pseudomonadota
- Class: Betaproteobacteria
- Order: Burkholderiales
- Family: Oxalobacteraceae
- Genus: Noviherbaspirillum
- Species: N. suwonense

Binomial name
- Noviherbaspirillum suwonense Kim et al. 2014

Type strain
- 5410S-62, KACC 16657, NBRC 108944

= Noviherbaspirillum suwonense =

Species of bacterium

Noviherbaspirillum suwonense is a Gram-negative, aerobic, rod-shaped, mesophilic and motile bacterium from the genus of Noviherbaspirillum which has been isolated from air in Suwon in Korea.
