= Noviherbaspirillum massiliense =

Scientific classification
- Domain: Bacteria
- Kingdom: Pseudomonadati
- Phylum: Pseudomonadota
- Class: Betaproteobacteria
- Order: Burkholderiales
- Family: Oxalobacteraceae
- Genus: Noviherbaspirillum
- Species: N. massiliense

Binomial name
- Noviherbaspirillum massiliense (Lagier et al. 2014) Chaudhary and Kim 2017

Type strain
- CSUR P159, DSM 25712

Synonyms
- Herbaspirillum massiliense

Species of bacterium

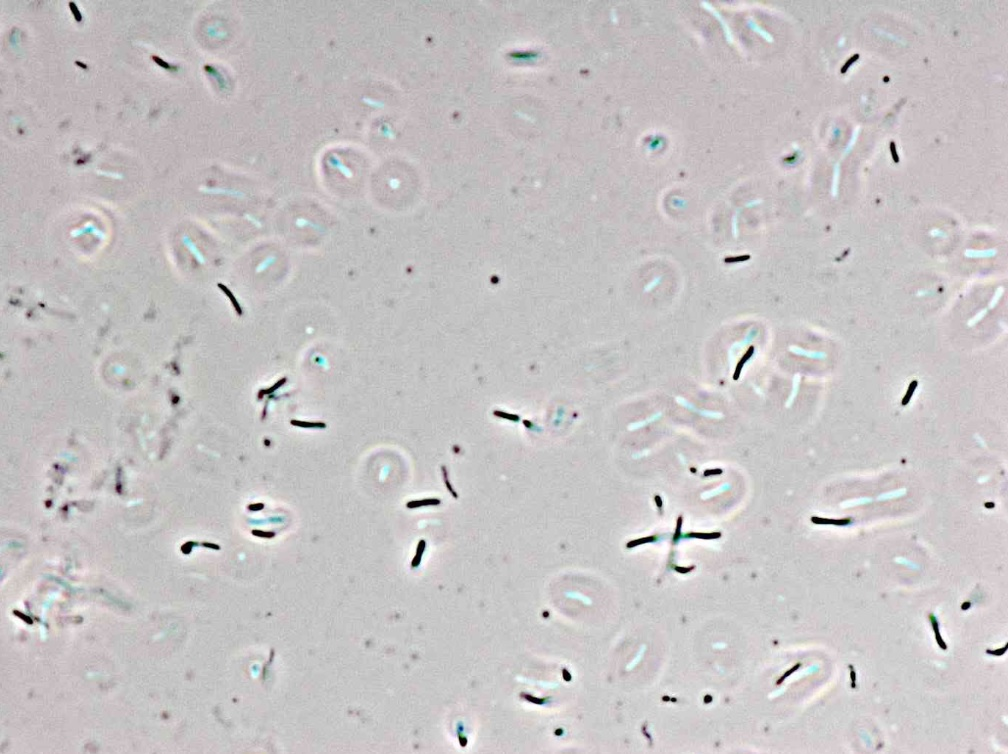

Noviherbaspirillum massiliense is a bacterium from the genus of Noviherbaspirillum which has been isolated from human faeces.
