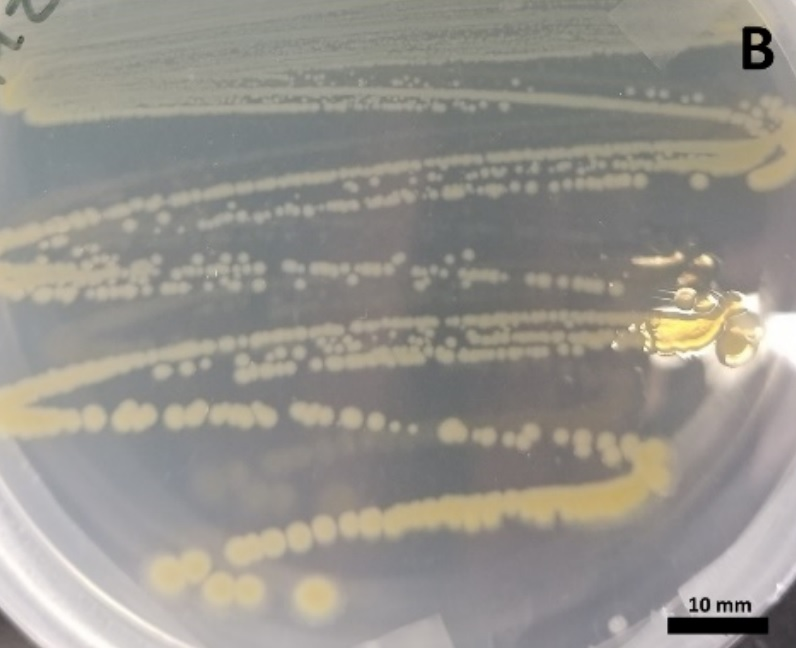

Scientific classification
- Domain: Bacteria
- Kingdom: Pseudomonadati
- Phylum: Pseudomonadota
- Class: Betaproteobacteria
- Order: Burkholderiales
- Family: Oxalobacteraceae
- Genus: Massilia
- Species: M. aerilata

Binomial name
- Massilia aerilata Weon et al. 2008, sp. nov.

Type strain
- 5516S-11, DSM 19289, KACC 12505

= Massilia aerilata =

Species of bacterium

Massilia aerilata is an aerobic, Gram-negative, rod-shaped, motile bacterium from the genus Massilia and the family Oxalobacteraceae which was isolated from air samples in the Suwon region of the Republic of Korea. 16S rRNA gene sequence analysis have shown that it belongs to the genus of Massilia. Colonies of M. aerilata are light yellow.
