= Pseudoduganella danionis =

Scientific classification
- Domain: Bacteria
- Kingdom: Pseudomonadati
- Phylum: Pseudomonadota
- Class: Betaproteobacteria
- Order: Burkholderiales
- Family: Oxalobacteraceae
- Genus: Pseudoduganella
- Species: P. danionis

Binomial name
- Pseudoduganella danionis Kämpfer et al. 2016

Type strain
- CCM 8698, LMG 29678, E3/2

Species of bacterium

Pseudoduganella danionis is a Gram-negative and rod-shaped bacterium from the genus of Pseudoduganella which has been isolated from the zebrafish (Danio rerio).
