= Oxalicibacterium solurbis =

Scientific classification
- Domain: Bacteria
- Kingdom: Pseudomonadati
- Phylum: Pseudomonadota
- Class: Betaproteobacteria
- Order: Burkholderiales
- Family: Oxalobacteraceae
- Genus: Oxalicibacterium
- Species: O. solurbis

Binomial name
- Oxalicibacterium solurbis Sahin et al. 2010, sp. nov.

Type strain
- CCM 7664, MY14, NBRC 102665

Species of bacterium

Oxalicibacterium solurbis is a Gram-negative, rod-shaped, and aerobic bacterium from the genus Oxalicibacterium and family Oxalobacteraceae.
