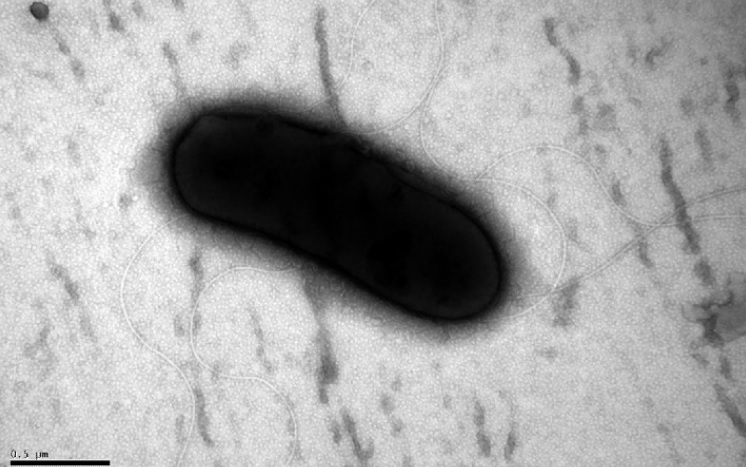

Scientific classification
- Domain: Bacteria
- Kingdom: Pseudomonadati
- Phylum: Pseudomonadota
- Class: Betaproteobacteria
- Order: Burkholderiales
- Family: Oxalobacteraceae
- Genus: Massilia
- Species: M. tieshanensis

Binomial name
- Massilia tieshanensis Du et al. 2012, sp. nov.

Type strain
- CCTCC AB 2010202, KACC 14940, TS3

= Massilia tieshanensis =

Species of bacterium

Massilia tieshanensis is a Gram-negative, non-spore-forming rod-shaped, motile bacterium from the genus Massilia and family Oxalobacteraceae, which was isolated from a metal mine soil in Tieshan District in central China. Colonies are straw-yellow.
