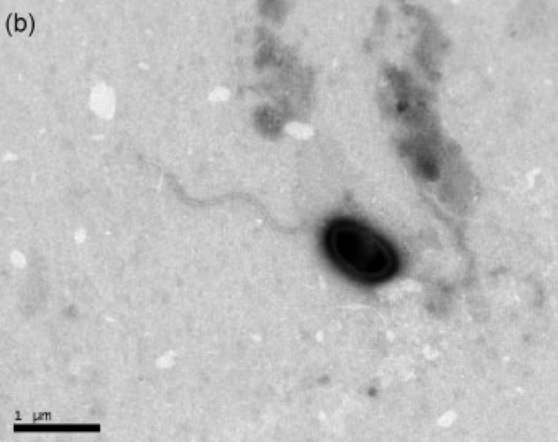
- Pseudoduganella violaceinigra

Scientific classification
- Domain: Bacteria
- Kingdom: Pseudomonadati
- Phylum: Pseudomonadota
- Class: Betaproteobacteria
- Order: Burkholderiales
- Family: Oxalobacteraceae
- Genus: Pseudoduganella
- Species: P. violaceinigra

Binomial name
- Pseudoduganella violaceinigra Kampfer, et al. 2012

Type strain
- CCUG 50881, CIP 108077, DSM 15887, KCTC 12193, YIM 31327

Synonyms
- Duganella violaceusniger, Duganella violaceinigra

= Pseudoduganella violaceinigra =

Species of bacterium

Pseudoduganella violaceinigra is a mesophilic bacterium of the genus Duganella in the Oxalobacteraceae family which was isolated from forest soil in Yunnan Province in China.
