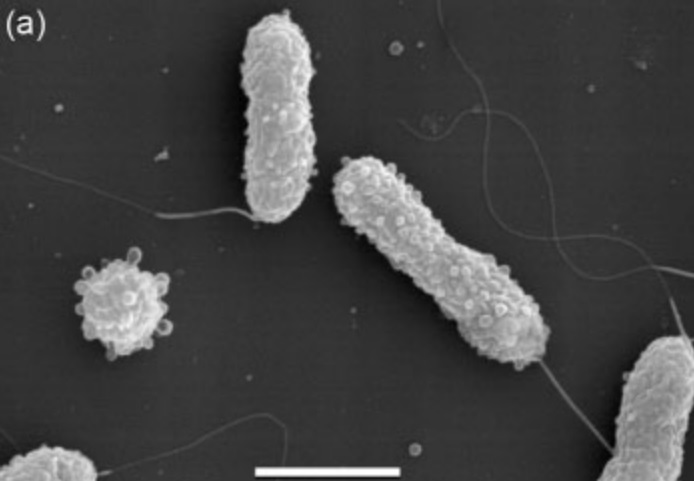
- Massilia brevitalea

Scientific classification
- Domain: Bacteria
- Kingdom: Pseudomonadati
- Phylum: Pseudomonadota
- Class: Betaproteobacteria
- Order: Burkholderiales
- Family: Oxalobacteraceae
- Genus: Massilia
- Species: M. brevitalea

Binomial name
- Massilia brevitalea Zul et al. 2008, sp. nov.

Type strain
- ATCC BAA-1465, byr23-80, DSM 18925

= Massilia brevitalea =

Species of bacterium

Massilia brevitalea is a Gram-negative, strictly aerobic non-spore-forming short rods bacterium from the genus Massilia and family Oxalobacteraceae, which was isolated from lysimeter soil. Colonies of M. brevitalea are pale white to yellow in color.

== Etymology ==
The specific name brevitalea comes from the Latin adjective brevis which means "short" and the Latin talea which means "bar" or "rod", which refers to the shape of cells.
