= Naxibacter haematophilus =

Scientific classification
- Domain: Bacteria
- Kingdom: Pseudomonadati
- Phylum: Pseudomonadota
- Class: Betaproteobacteria
- Order: Burkholderiales
- Family: Oxalobacteraceae
- Genus: Naxibacter
- Species: N. haematophilus

Binomial name
- Naxibacter haematophilus Kampfer et al. 2008

Type strain
- 961*00179/97, 962*00283/97, CCM 7480, CCUG 38318, Lund BB 06200/97, R-3581, Vandamme R3581

Species of bacterium

Naxibacter haematophilus is a Gram-negative, rod-shaped, oxidase-positive, and non-spore-forming bacterium which was isolated from clinical specimens and water samples.

== Etymology ==
Its specific name comes from the Greek haem (-atosa), which means "blood", and the Greek philos, which means "loving", because the strain was isolated from blood.
