= Massilia aurea =

Scientific classification
- Domain: Bacteria
- Kingdom: Pseudomonadati
- Phylum: Pseudomonadota
- Class: Betaproteobacteria
- Order: Burkholderiales
- Family: Oxalobacteraceae
- Genus: Massilia
- Species: M. aurea

Binomial name
- Massilia aurea Gallego et al. 2006, sp. nov.

Type strain
- AP13, CCM 7363, CECT 7142, CIP 109392, DSM 18055, JCM 13879, strain AP13

Species of bacterium

Massilia aurea is a Gram-negative, rod-shaped non-spore-forming motile and strictly aerobic bacterium from the genus Massilia and family Oxalobacteraceae. It was isolated from the drinking water distribution system in Seville, Spain. M. aurea produces yellow-pigmented colonies.

== Etymology ==
The specific name aurea comes from the Latin adjective aurea ("golden") which refers to the yellow pigment that M. aurea produces.
