= Undibacterium jejuense =

Scientific classification
- Domain: Bacteria
- Kingdom: Pseudomonadati
- Phylum: Pseudomonadota
- Class: Betaproteobacteria
- Order: Burkholderiales
- Family: Oxalobacteraceae
- Genus: Undibacterium
- Species: U. jejuense

Binomial name
- Undibacterium jejuense Kim et al. 2014

Type strain
- KACC 12607, NBRC 108922, JS04-04

Species of bacterium

Undibacterium jejuense is a Gram-negative, aerobic and motile bacterium from the genus of Undibacterium, which has been isolated from forest soil from the Jeju Island and water from the Seoho lake in Korea.
