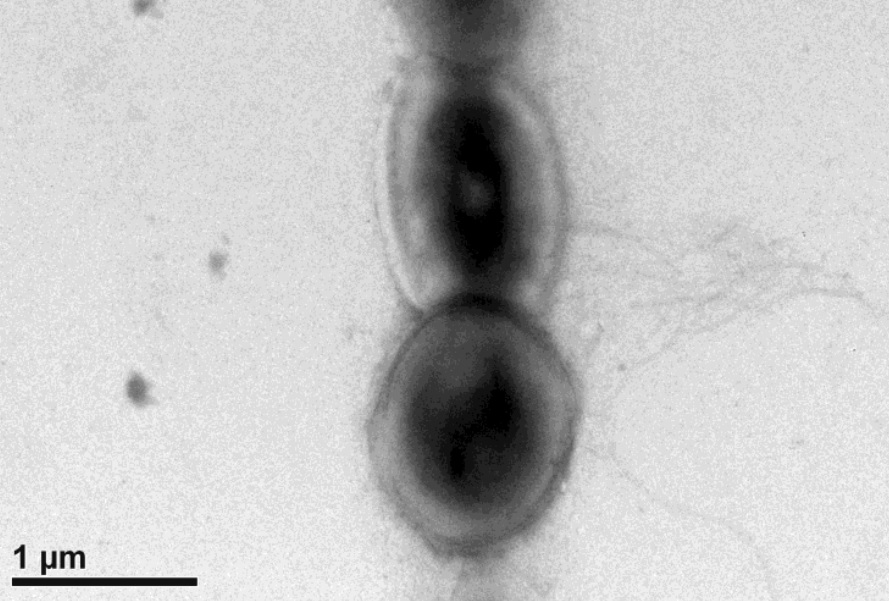

Scientific classification
- Domain: Bacteria
- Kingdom: Pseudomonadati
- Phylum: Pseudomonadota
- Class: Betaproteobacteria
- Order: Burkholderiales
- Family: Oxalobacteraceae
- Genus: Noviherbaspirillum
- Species: N. malthae

Binomial name
- Noviherbaspirillum malthae Lin et al. 2013

Type strain
- BCRC 80516, CC-AFH3, JCM 18414

Synonyms
- Pseudoburkholderia malthae Herbaspirillum malthae Novoherbaspirillum malthae

= Noviherbaspirillum malthae =

Species of bacterium

Noviherbaspirillum malthae is a Gram-negative, aerobic and rod-shaped bacterium from the genus Noviherbaspirillum which has been isolated from Kaohsiung County in Taiwan.
