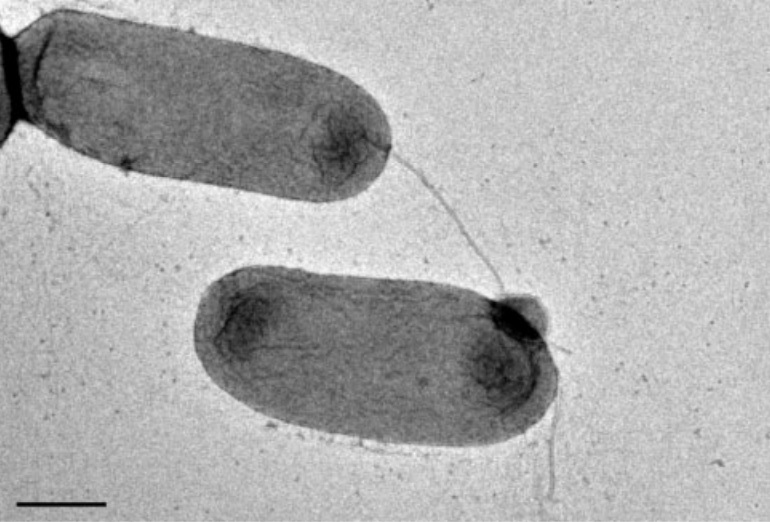

Scientific classification
- Domain: Bacteria
- Kingdom: Pseudomonadati
- Phylum: Pseudomonadota
- Class: Betaproteobacteria
- Order: Burkholderiales
- Family: Oxalobacteraceae
- Genus: Massilia
- Species: M. eurypsychrophila

Binomial name
- Massilia eurypsychrophila Shen et al. 2015

Type strain
- CGMCC 1.12828, JCM 30074, B528-3

= Massilia eurypsychrophila =

Species of bacterium

Massilia eurypsychrophila is a Gram-negative, aerobic, rod-shaped and facultatively psychrophilic bacterium from the genus Massilia with a polar flagella which has been isolated from the ice core of the Muztagh Glacier in Xinjiang in China.
