= Herminiimonas arsenicoxydans =

Scientific classification
- Domain: Bacteria
- Kingdom: Pseudomonadati
- Phylum: Pseudomonadota
- Class: Betaproteobacteria
- Order: Burkholderiales
- Family: Oxalobacteraceae
- Genus: Herminiimonas
- Species: H. arsenicoxydans

Binomial name
- Herminiimonas arsenicoxydans Muller et al., 2006

Species of bacterium

Herminiimonas arsenicoxydans is a species of ultramicrobacteria. First reported in 2006, it was isolated from industrial sludge and is able to oxidise the toxic chemical element arsenic.
