= Massilia haematophila =

Scientific classification
- Domain: Bacteria
- Kingdom: Pseudomonadati
- Phylum: Pseudomonadota
- Class: Betaproteobacteria
- Order: Burkholderiales
- Family: Oxalobacteraceae
- Genus: Massilia
- Species: M. haematophila

Binomial name
- Massilia haematophila (Kämpfer et al. 2008) Kämpfer et al. 2011

Type strain
- 961*00179/97, 962*00283/97, CCM 7480, CCUG 38318, Lund BB 06200/97, R-3581, Vandamme R3581

Synonyms
- Naxibacter haematophilus

Species of bacterium

Massilia haematophila is a Gram-negative, rod-shaped, non-spore-forming bacterium from the genus Massilia and family Oxalobacteraceae, which was isolated from a human clinical specimen.
