= Herminiimonas aquatilis =

Scientific classification
- Domain: Bacteria
- Kingdom: Pseudomonadati
- Phylum: Pseudomonadota
- Class: Betaproteobacteria
- Order: Burkholderiales
- Family: Oxalobacteraceae
- Genus: Herminiimonas
- Species: H. aquatilis

Binomial name
- Herminiimonas aquatilis Fernandez et al., 2005

Species of bacterium

Herminiimonas aquatilis is a bacterial species isolated from drinking water.
