= Glaciimonas alpina =

Scientific classification
- Domain: Bacteria
- Kingdom: Pseudomonadati
- Phylum: Pseudomonadota
- Class: Betaproteobacteria
- Order: Burkholderiales
- Family: Oxalobacteraceae
- Genus: Glaciimonas
- Species: G. alpina

Binomial name
- Glaciimonas alpina Frasson et al. 2015

Type strain
- CCOS 761, DSM 22814, CCOS247, CCOS250, CCOS258, strain Cr9-12

Species of bacterium

Glaciimonas alpina is a bacterium from the genus Glaciimonas which has been isolated from cryoconite from the Tiefenbachferner glacier in Austria.
