= Massilia norwichensis =

Scientific classification
- Domain: Bacteria
- Kingdom: Pseudomonadati
- Phylum: Pseudomonadota
- Class: Betaproteobacteria
- Order: Burkholderiales
- Family: Oxalobacteraceae
- Genus: Massilia
- Species: M. norwichensis

Binomial name
- Massilia norwichensis Orthovã et al. 2015

Type strain
- CCUG 65457, LMG 28164, NS9

Species of bacterium

Massilia norwichensis is a Gram-negative and rod-shaped bacterium from the genus Massilia which has been isolated from air from the Sainsbury Centre for Visual Arts in Norwich in England.
