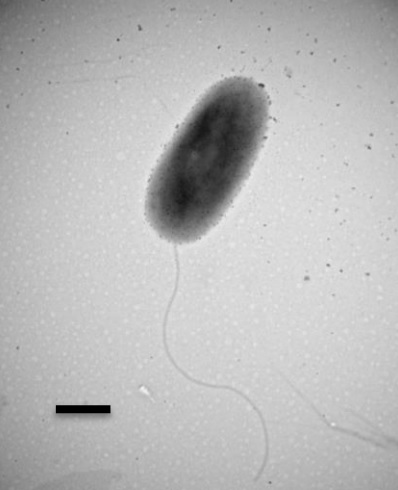

Scientific classification
- Domain: Bacteria
- Kingdom: Pseudomonadati
- Phylum: Pseudomonadota
- Class: Betaproteobacteria
- Order: Burkholderiales
- Family: Oxalobacteraceae
- Genus: Undibacterium
- Species: U. amnicola

Binomial name
- Undibacterium amnicola Chen et al. 2017

Type strain
- BCRC 81009, KCTC 52442, LMG 29730, KYPY9

= Undibacterium amnicola =

Species of bacterium

Undibacterium amnicola is a Gram-negative, strictly aerobic and motile bacterium from the genus of Undibacterium which has been isolated from water from the Funglin Stream in Taiwan.
