= Naxibacter alkalitolerans =

Scientific classification
- Domain: Bacteria
- Kingdom: Pseudomonadati
- Phylum: Pseudomonadota
- Class: Betaproteobacteria
- Order: Burkholderiales
- Family: Oxalobacteraceae
- Genus: Naxibacter
- Species: N. alkalitolerans

Binomial name
- Naxibacter alkalitolerans Xu et al. 2005, sp. nov.

Type strain
- CCTCC AA 204003, CCUG 50882, CIP 108793, DSM 17462, KCTC 12194, YIM 31775

Species of bacterium

Naxibacter alkalitolerans is a chemo-organotrophic, catalase-positive, aerobic, and Gram-negative bacterium, which was isolated from a soil sample collected from Yunnan Province in China. Phylogenetic analyses have shown that it belongs to the Oxalobacteraceae.
