= Massilia niastensis =

Scientific classification
- Domain: Bacteria
- Kingdom: Pseudomonadati
- Phylum: Pseudomonadota
- Class: Betaproteobacteria
- Order: Burkholderiales
- Family: Oxalobacteraceae
- Genus: Massilia
- Species: M. niastensis

Binomial name
- Massilia niastensis Weon et al. 2009, sp. nov.

Type strain
- 5516S-1, CIP 110038, DSM 21313, KACC 12599

Species of bacterium

Massilia niastensis is a Gram-negative, aerobic, motile, rod -shaped bacterium from the genus Massilia and family Oxalobacteraceae, which was isolated with Massilia niabensis from air samples from Suwon in Korea. Colonies of M. niastensis are ivory-coloured.
