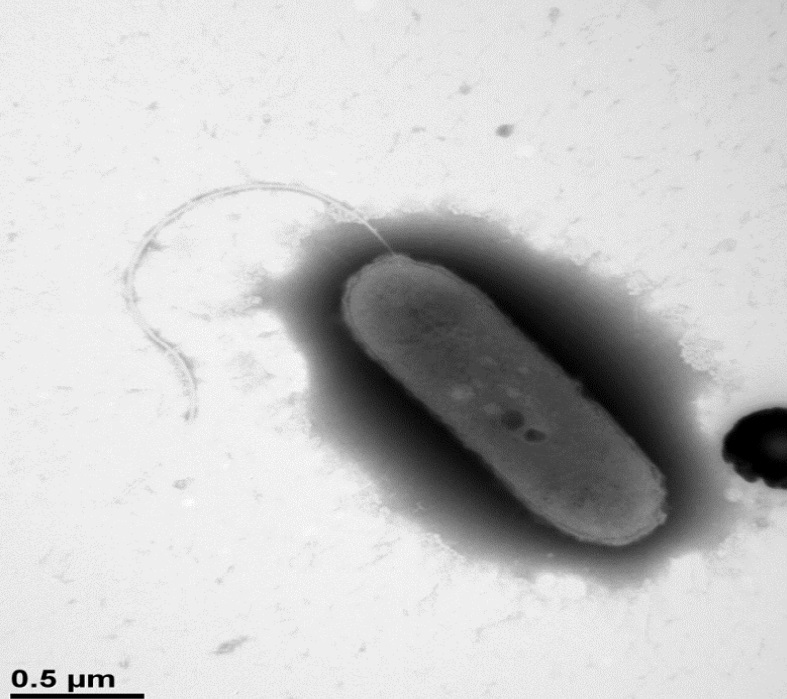

Scientific classification
- Domain: Bacteria
- Kingdom: Pseudomonadati
- Phylum: Pseudomonadota
- Class: Betaproteobacteria
- Order: Burkholderiales
- Family: Oxalobacteraceae
- Genus: Undibacterium
- Species: U. aquatile

Binomial name
- Undibacterium aquatile Du et al. 2015

Type strain
- CCTCC AB 2015119, KCTC 42243, THG-DN7.3

= Undibacterium aquatile =

Species of bacterium

Undibacterium aquatile is a Gram-negative, strictly aerobic, rod-shaped and motile bacterium from the genus of Undibacterium which has been isolated from the waterfall of the Gyeryongsan mountain in Korea.
