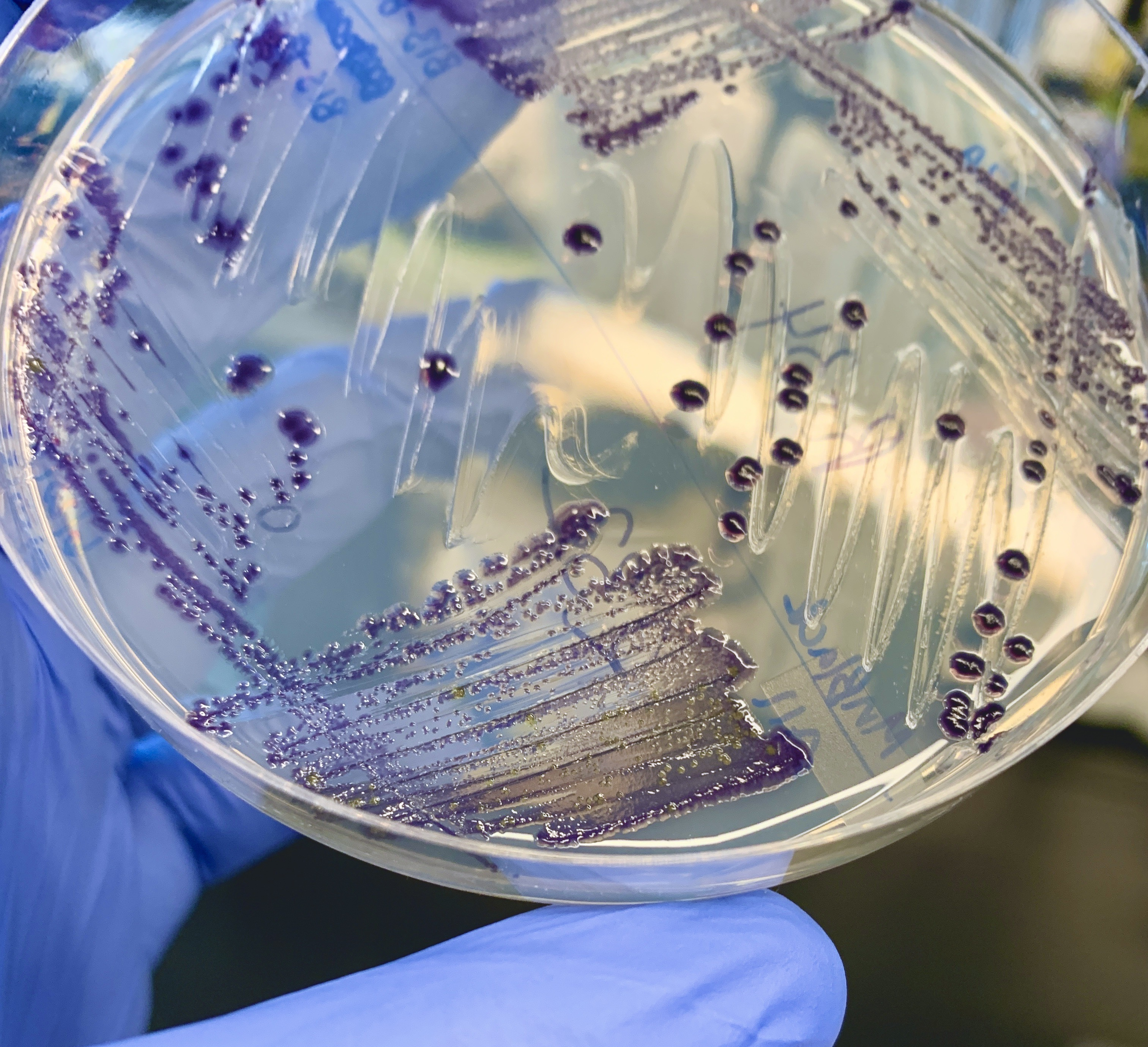
- Violacein-producing Massilia growing on a petri plate

Scientific classification
- Domain: Bacteria
- Kingdom: Pseudomonadati
- Phylum: Pseudomonadota
- Class: Betaproteobacteria
- Order: Burkholderiales
- Family: Oxalobacteraceae
- Genus: Massilia; La Scola et al. 2000

Species
- Massilia aerilata Massilia albidiflava Massilia alkalitolerans Massilia aurea Massilia arvi Massilia brevitalea Massilia consociata Massilia dura Massilia eurypsychrophila Massilia haematophila Massilia jejuensis Massilia kyonggiensis Massilia lurida Massilia lutea Massilia niabensis Massilia niastensis Massilia norwichensis Massilia oculi Massilia plicata Massilia putida Massilia soli Massilia suwonensis Massilia tieshanensis Massilia cf. timonae Massilia timonae Massilia umbonata Massilia varians Massilia yuzhufengensis

= Massilia (bacterium) =

Genus of bacteria

The genus Massilia is an outdated genus name of bacteria within the family Oxalobacteriaceae. All Massilia species were reclassified in 2023 into one of the following genera: Duganella, Pseudoduganella, Janthinobacterium, Telluria, Rugamonas, Mokoshia, or Zemynaea.

They may contain either peritrichous or polar flagella. This genus was first described in 1998, after the type species, Massilia timonae, was isolated from the blood of an immunocompromised patient. The genus was named after the old Greek and Roman name for the city of Marseille, France, where the organism was first isolated. However, 16S rRNA-based phylogenetic trees in 2023 determined that many Massilia species actually belong within the Telluria genus, which was validly published first, having nomenclatural priority.

Massilia are a diverse group that reside in many different environments, have many heterotrophic means of gathering energy, and are commonly found in association with plants.

== Culture of Massilia ==
Isolation of Massilia sp. commonly occurs on Reasoner's 2A (R2A) agar. Colonies are often shades of white, yellow, or orange, but may be blue-purple if producing the compound violacein.

== Phylogeny ==
Members of the genus Massilia have been re-classified into other genera as of 2023 using 16S rRNA-based phylogenetic trees. Originally, the Massilia genus existed within a polyphyletic group of the Oxalobacteriaceae, alongside other genera including Duganella, Pseudoduganella, Janthinobacterium, Telluria, and Rugamonas. In 2023, it was discovered that the type species of the genus, Telluria mixta, had nomenclatural priority over the name "Massilia", having been validly published first. Thus, all isolated Massilia species have been reclassified into the following genera: Duganella, Pseudoduganella, Janthinobacterium, Telluria, Rugamonas, or the novel genera Mokoshia and Zemynaea.

== Habitats ==
Massilia sp. are environmental organisms that are commonly associated with plants. They have been isolated from the soil, flowers, seeds, and roots of many species of plants. They are generally psychrophilic or mesophilic, preferring cool to moderate temperatures, and they are generally either strict aerobes or microaerophiles. Massilia are proficient at surface colonization, including the seed coat, emerging radicles, roots, and even the hyphae of Pythium.

Massilia have been isolated from other, sometimes extreme, environments as well, including the Sahara Desert, freshwater, glaciers, rocks, and air samples. Manganese-oxidizing Massilia have been isolated. In rare cases, some Massilia sp. have caused infections in humans. However, doctors presume that these infections were likely opportunistic, as Massilia sp. are generally considered environmental organisms, rather than animal-associated.

== Metabolism ==
=== Complex polymer degradation ===
Some Massilia sp. are able to degrade cellulose or chitin, two naturally occurring carbohydrate polymers, using cellulase and endochitinase enzymes, respectively. Many Massilia produce extracellular proteases, which can degrade proteins, producing carbon and nitrogen for the organism to consume, Massilia have also been reported to hydrolyse gelatin, casein, starch, DNA, tyrosine, and more. Massilia may play a crucial role in carbon cycling due to their broad range of degradative enzymes,

Massilia also have the potential to degrade many pollutants present in the environment. Massilia sp. WF1 was able to degrade the polycyclic aromatic hydrocarbon phenanthrene, each when alone and when in co-culture with the fungal species Phanerochaete chrysosporium.

=== Plant-growth-promoting traits ===
Some Massilia sp. are capable of phosphorus solubilization in the soil. Phosphorus solubilization allows plants to take in more phosphorus, potentially promoting plant growth. Analysis of Massilia genomes has identified genes for producing auxins, plant hormones, which can promote or alter plant growth. Their hydrolysis of extracellular compounds, such as proteins or DNA, can also release nutrients for the plant or other bacteria to utilize.

Antibiotic production is found in a few Massilia isolates, though many of these antibiotic compounds have not been identified. Massilia rhizosphaerae has antibacterial activity against the plant pathogen Ralstonia solanacearum.Massilia antibiotica has antibacterial activity against the pathogens Escherichia coli and Pseudomonas aeruginosa.

=== Quorum-regulated traits ===
Some Massilia sp. are known to produce violacein, a pigment also prouduced by Chromobacterium violaceum. This produces blue-purple pigmented colonies. Violacein production is regulated by quorum-sensing. a mechanism by which bacteria alter their gene expression in response to the population density.
