= Undibacterium piscinae =

Scientific classification
- Domain: Bacteria
- Kingdom: Pseudomonadati
- Phylum: Pseudomonadota
- Class: Betaproteobacteria
- Order: Burkholderiales
- Family: Oxalobacteraceae
- Genus: Undibacterium
- Species: U. piscinae

Binomial name
- Undibacterium piscinae Lee et al. 2019

Type strain
- S11R28

Species of bacterium

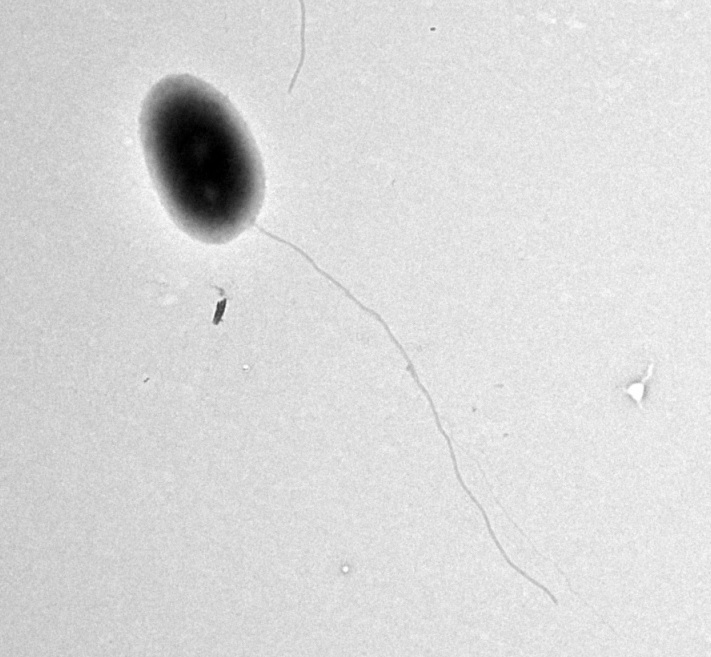
Undibacterium piscinae

Undibacterium piscinae is a Gram-negative, rod-shaped, non-spore-forming, obligate aerobic and motile bacterium of the genus Undibacterium which has been isolated from the intestinal tract of the fish Coreoleuciscus splendidus.
