= Telluria chitinolytica =

Scientific classification
- Domain: Bacteria
- Kingdom: Pseudomonadati
- Phylum: Pseudomonadota
- Class: Betaproteobacteria
- Order: Burkholderiales
- Family: Oxalobacteraceae
- Genus: Telluria
- Species: T. chitinolytica

Binomial name
- Telluria chitinolytica Bowman et al. 1993

Type strain
- 20M, ACM 3522, CIP 104069, CNCM I-804, DSM 9559

Species of bacterium

Telluria chitinolytica is a bacterium from the genus Telluria in the family Oxalobacteraceae.
