= Noviherbaspirillum humi =

Scientific classification
- Domain: Bacteria
- Kingdom: Pseudomonadati
- Phylum: Pseudomonadota
- Class: Betaproteobacteria
- Order: Burkholderiales
- Family: Oxalobacteraceae
- Genus: Noviherbaspirillum
- Species: N. humi

Binomial name
- Noviherbaspirillum humi Sundararaman et al. 2017

Type strain
- JCM 19873, KEMB 7305-102, U15, U32

Species of bacterium

Noviherbaspirillum humi is a Gram-negative, non-spore-forming, short rod-shaped, facultative aerobic and motile bacterium from the genus Noviherbaspirillum which has been isolated from soil from Ukraine.
