= Massilia oculi =

Scientific classification
- Domain: Bacteria
- Kingdom: Pseudomonadati
- Phylum: Pseudomonadota
- Class: Betaproteobacteria
- Order: Burkholderiales
- Family: Oxalobacteraceae
- Genus: Massilia
- Species: M. oculi

Binomial name
- Massilia oculi Kämpfer et al. 2012, sp. nov.

Type strain
- CCM 7900, CCUG 43427 A

Species of bacterium

Massilia oculi is a Gram-negative, rod-shaped, non-spore-forming bacterium from the genus Massilia and family Oxalobacteraceae, which was isolated from a patient suffering from endophthalmitis. Its 16S rRNA gene sequence analysis has shown that it belongs to Massilia.
