= Massilia jejuensis =

Scientific classification
- Domain: Bacteria
- Kingdom: Pseudomonadati
- Phylum: Pseudomonadota
- Class: Betaproteobacteria
- Order: Burkholderiales
- Family: Oxalobacteraceae
- Genus: Massilia
- Species: M. jejuensis

Binomial name
- Massilia jejuensis Weon et al. 2010, sp. nov.

Type strain
- 5317J-18, DSM 21309, KACC 12634

Species of bacterium

Massilia jejuensis is a Gram-negative, aerobic, rod-shaped, motile bacterium with a single flagellum from the genus Massilia and family Oxalobacteraceae, which was isolated from air samples from Jeju Island in Korea. Colonies of M. jejuensis are light orange.

== Etymology ==
The specific name jejuensis comes from the name "Jeju Island" where this type strain was found.
