= Undibacterium seohonense =

Scientific classification
- Domain: Bacteria
- Kingdom: Pseudomonadati
- Phylum: Pseudomonadota
- Class: Betaproteobacteria
- Order: Burkholderiales
- Family: Oxalobacteraceae
- Genus: Undibacterium
- Species: U. seohonense

Binomial name
- Undibacterium seohonense Kim et al. 2014

Type strain
- KACC 16656, NBRC 108929, strain SHS5-24

Species of bacterium

Undibacterium seohonense is a Gram-negative, aerobic and motile bacterium from the genus of Undibacterium which has been isolated from water from the Seoho Lake from Suwon in Korea.
