= Undibacterium oligocarboniphilum =

Scientific classification
- Domain: Bacteria
- Kingdom: Pseudomonadati
- Phylum: Pseudomonadota
- Class: Betaproteobacteria
- Order: Burkholderiales
- Family: Oxalobacteraceae
- Genus: Undibacterium
- Species: U. oligocarboniphilum

Binomial name
- Undibacterium oligocarboniphilum Eder et al. 2011, sp. nov.

Type strain
- CCUG 57265, DSM 21777, EM 1

Species of bacterium

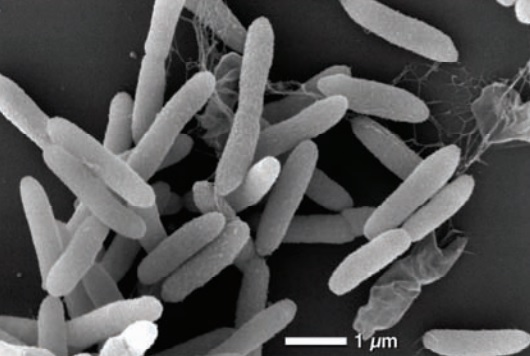
Microscope image of undibacterium oligocarboniphilum.

Undibacterium oligocarboniphilum is a Gram-negative, oxidase positive, catalase positive, flagellated, rod-shaped bacterium of the genus Undibacterium which was isolated from purified water. Its 16S rRNA gene sequence analysis has shown that it belongs to the family Oxalobacteraceae.
