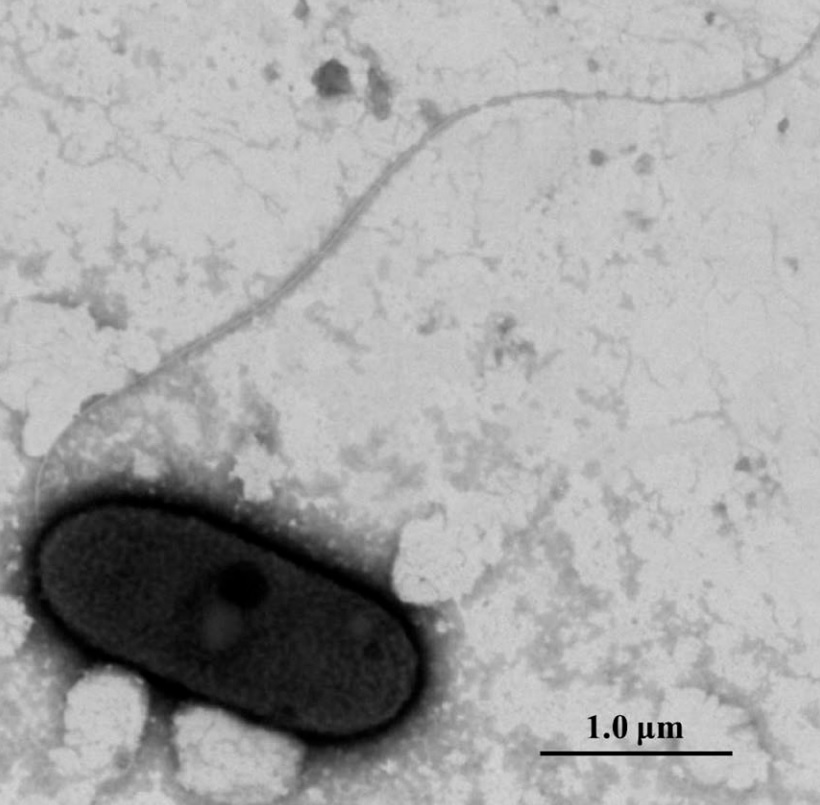

Scientific classification
- Domain: Bacteria
- Kingdom: Pseudomonadati
- Phylum: Pseudomonadota
- Class: Betaproteobacteria
- Order: Burkholderiales
- Family: Oxalobacteraceae
- Genus: Massilia
- Species: M. putida

Binomial name
- Massilia putida Feng et al. 2016

Type strain
- DSM 27523, KCTC 42761, 6NM-7

= Massilia putida =

Species of bacterium

Massilia putida is a Gram-negative and motile bacterium from the genus Massilia with a single polar flagellum, which has been isolated from a wolfram mine in Dayu County in the Jiangxi Province in China. Massilia putida has the ability to produce dimethyl disulfide.
