= Massilia yuzhufengensis =

Scientific classification
- Domain: Bacteria
- Kingdom: Pseudomonadati
- Phylum: Pseudomonadota
- Class: Betaproteobacteria
- Order: Burkholderiales
- Family: Oxalobacteraceae
- Genus: Massilia
- Species: M. yuzhufengensis

Binomial name
- Massilia yuzhufengensis Shen et al. 2013

Type strain
- CGMCC 1.12041, KACC 16569, Y1243-1

Species of bacterium

Massilia yuzhufengensis is a Gram-negative, rod-shaped, aerobic and motile bacterium from the genus Massilia with a polar flagella which has been isolated from the Yuzhufeng Glacier from the Tibetan Plateau in China.
