= Noviherbaspirillum autotrophicum =

Scientific classification
- Domain: Bacteria
- Kingdom: Pseudomonadati
- Phylum: Pseudomonadota
- Class: Betaproteobacteria
- Order: Burkholderiales
- Family: Oxalobacteraceae
- Genus: Noviherbaspirillum
- Species: N. autotrophicum

Binomial name
- Noviherbaspirillum autotrophicum Ishii et al. 2017

Type strain
- DSM 25787, TSA66, TSO23-1, JCM 17723

Species of bacterium

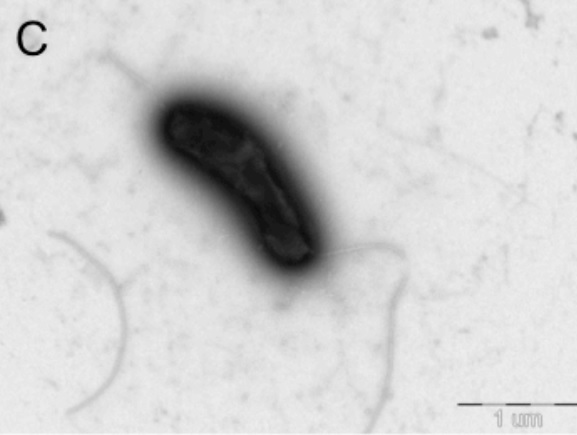
Noviherbaspirillum autotrophicum

Noviherbaspirillum autotrophicum is a Gram-negative and rod-shaped bacterium from the genus of Noviherbaspirillum which has been isolated from rice paddy soil.
