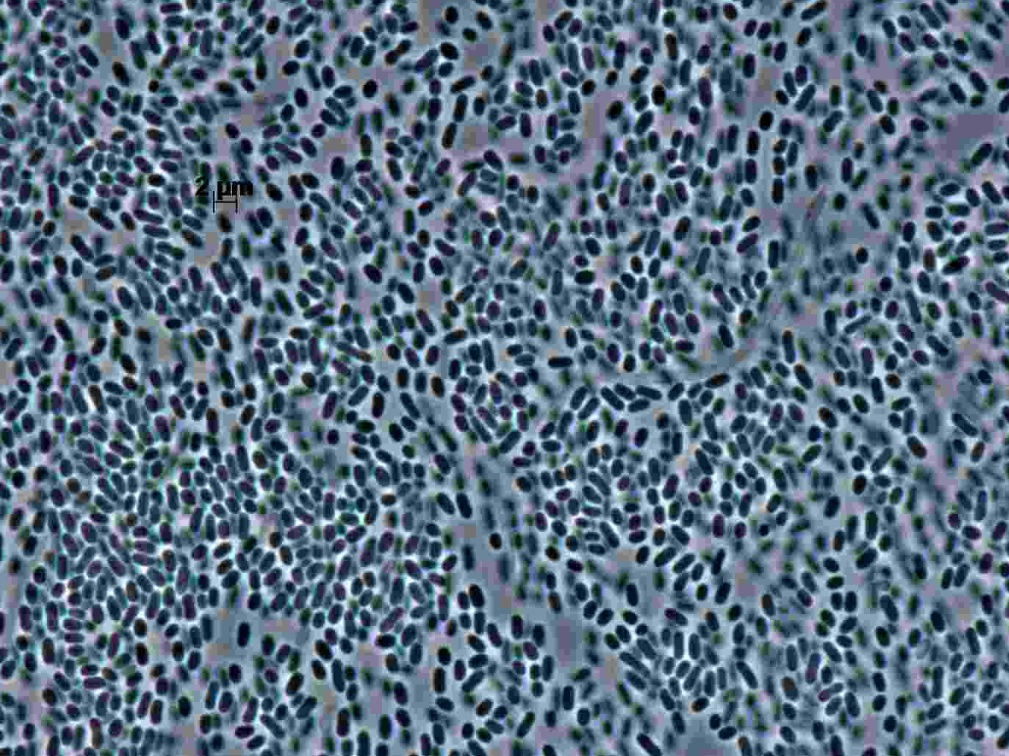

Scientific classification
- Domain: Bacteria
- Kingdom: Pseudomonadati
- Phylum: Pseudomonadota
- Class: Betaproteobacteria
- Order: Burkholderiales
- Family: Oxalobacteraceae
- Genus: Telluria
- Species: T. mixta

Binomial name
- Telluria mixta (Bowman et al. 1989); Bowman et al. 1993

Synonyms
- Pseudomonas mixta Bowman et al. 1989

= Telluria mixta =

Species of bacterium

Telluria mixta (formerly called Pseudomonas mixta) is a species of Gram-negative soil bacteria that actively degrades polysaccharides including dextran, inulin, pectate, starch, and xylan. The bacterium is straight-rod-shaped, 0.5 to 1.0 μm wide and usually 2 to 3 μm long, and can grow both lateral and polar flagella. Optimal growth is seen between 30 and 35 °C, at a neutral pH, and with no salt present. Growth is totally inhibited in a sodium chloride concentration of 1.5% or more. A high level of nitrogenous carbon also inhibits growth.

The name generic name Telluria, meaning "from the earth", derives from Tellus, the Roman earth goddess.
