= Noviherbaspirillum psychrotolerans =

Scientific classification
- Domain: Bacteria
- Kingdom: Pseudomonadati
- Phylum: Pseudomonadota
- Class: Betaproteobacteria
- Order: Burkholderiales
- Family: Oxalobacteraceae
- Genus: Noviherbaspirillum
- Species: N. psychrotolerans

Binomial name
- Noviherbaspirillum psychrotolerans (Bajerski et al. 2013) Lin et al. 2013

Type strain
- DSM 26001, LMG 27282, PB1

Synonyms
- Herbaspirillum psychrotolerans

Species of bacterium

Noviherbaspirillum psychrotolerans is a Gram-negative, psychrotolerant, facultatively anaerobic and curved-rod-shaped bacterium from the genus of Noviherbaspirillum which has been isolated from soil of a glacier forefield from the Larsemann Hills from the Antarctica.
