= Herminiimonas fonticola =

Scientific classification
- Domain: Bacteria
- Kingdom: Pseudomonadati
- Phylum: Pseudomonadota
- Class: Betaproteobacteria
- Order: Burkholderiales
- Family: Oxalobacteraceae
- Genus: Herminiimonas
- Species: H. fonticola

Binomial name
- Herminiimonas fonticola Fernandez et al., 2005

Species of bacterium

Herminiimonas fonticola is the type species of the bacterial genus Herminiimonas. It was first recovered from the borehole of bottled mineral water in Eastern Portugal.
