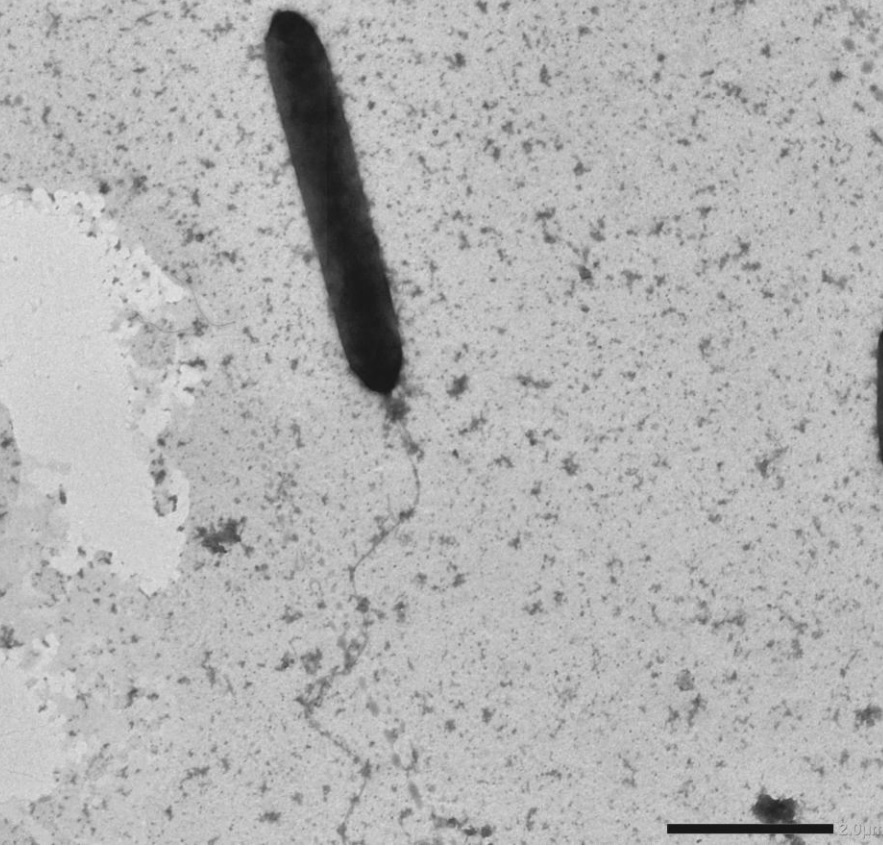

Scientific classification
- Domain: Bacteria
- Kingdom: Pseudomonadati
- Phylum: Pseudomonadota
- Class: Betaproteobacteria
- Order: Burkholderiales
- Family: Oxalobacteraceae
- Genus: Undibacterium
- Species: U. arcticum

Binomial name
- Undibacterium arcticum Li et al. 2016

Type strain
- CCTCC AB 2015162, KCTC 42986, strain 6-67

= Undibacterium arcticum =

Species of bacterium

Undibacterium arcticum is a Gram-negative, aerobic, rod-shaped and motile bacterium from the genus of Undibacterium which has been isolated from soil from the arctic alpine from Longyearbyen in Svalbard.
