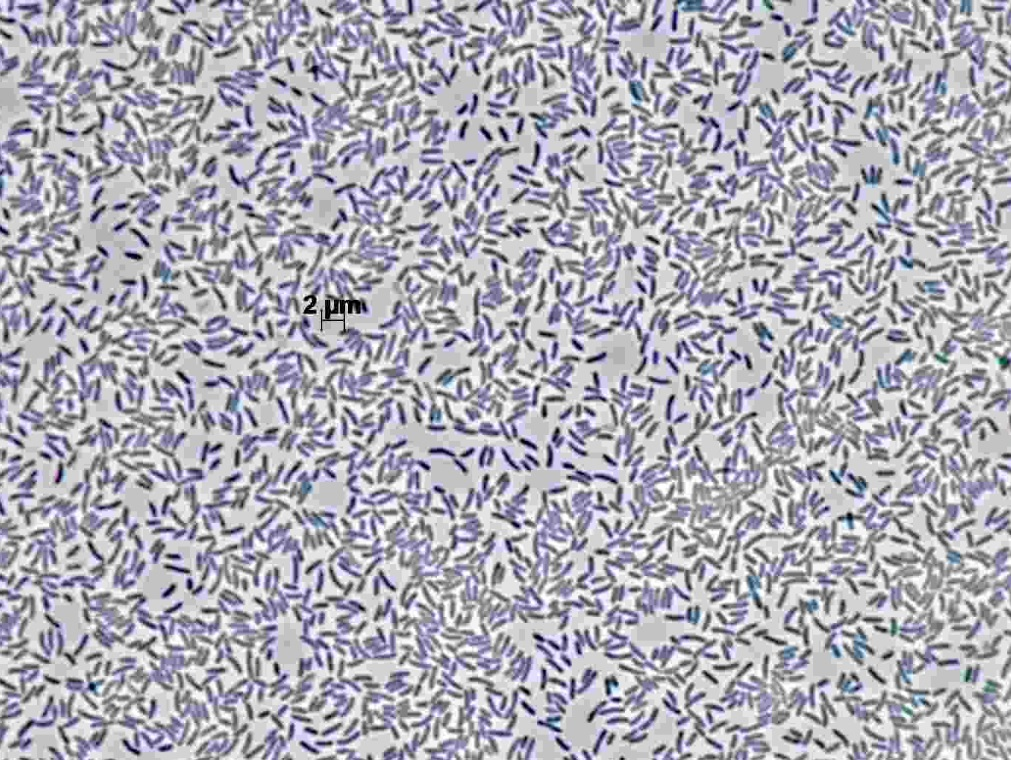

Scientific classification
- Domain: Bacteria
- Kingdom: Pseudomonadati
- Phylum: Pseudomonadota
- Class: Betaproteobacteria
- Order: Burkholderiales
- Family: Oxalobacteraceae
- Genus: Undibacterium
- Species: U. macrobrachii

Binomial name
- Undibacterium macrobrachii Sheu et al. 2014

Type strain
- BCRC 80406, KCTC 23916, LMG 26891, strain CMJ-9

= Undibacterium macrobrachii =

Species of bacterium

Undibacterium macrobrachii is a Gram-negative, strictly aerobic and motile bacterium from the genus of Undibacterium with a single polar flagellum which has been isolated from water from a pond which was cultivated with shrimps from Pingtung in Taiwan.
