= Massilia lurida =

Scientific classification
- Domain: Bacteria
- Kingdom: Pseudomonadati
- Phylum: Pseudomonadota
- Class: Betaproteobacteria
- Order: Burkholderiales
- Family: Oxalobacteraceae
- Genus: Massilia
- Species: M. lurida

Binomial name
- Massilia lurida Luo et al. 2013

Type strain
- CGMCC 1.10822, KCTC 23880, D5

Species of bacterium

Massilia lurida is a Gram-negative and rod-shaped and motile bacterium from the genus Massilia which has been isolated from soil from the Inner Mongolia Autonomous Region in China.
