= Collimonas fungivorans =

Scientific classification
- Domain: Bacteria
- Kingdom: Pseudomonadati
- Phylum: Pseudomonadota
- Class: Betaproteobacteria
- Order: Burkholderiales
- Family: Oxalobacteraceae
- Genus: Collimonas
- Species: C. fungivorans

Binomial name
- Collimonas fungivorans De Boer et al. 2004

Type strain
- CCUG 48868, CIP 108645, de Boer Ter6, DSM 17622, LMG 21973, NCCB 100033, Ter6

Species of bacterium

Collimonas fungivorans is a species of bacteria in the Oxalobacteraceae family which has antifungal activity against Aspergillus niger, for example. C. fungivorans has the ability to grow on living fungal hyphae.
