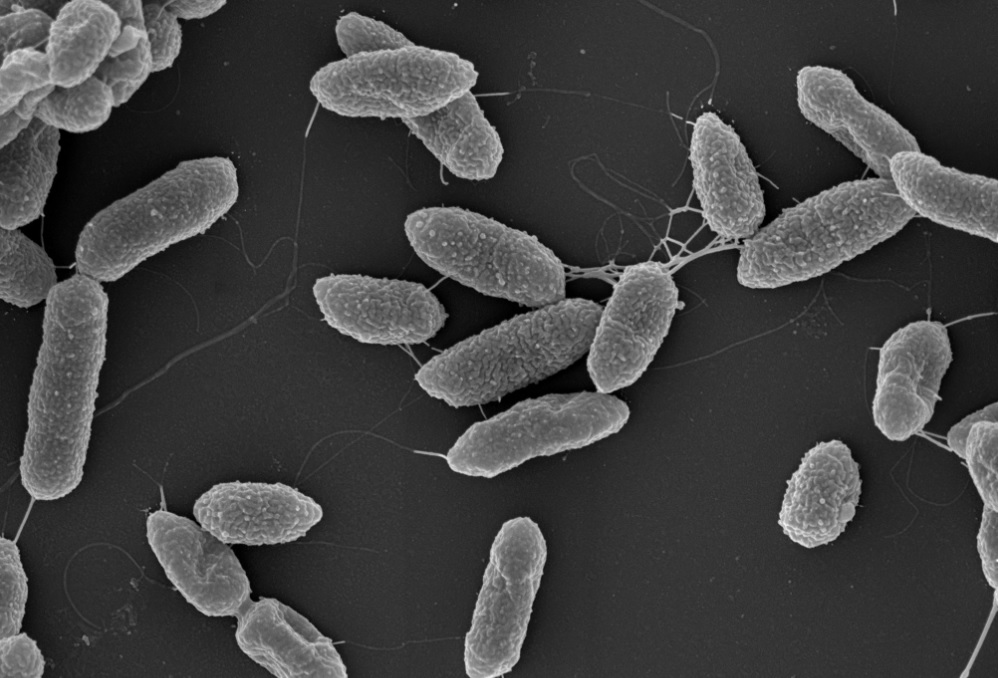
- Massilia alkalitolerans

Scientific classification
- Domain: Bacteria
- Kingdom: Pseudomonadati
- Phylum: Pseudomonadota
- Class: Betaproteobacteria
- Order: Burkholderiales
- Family: Oxalobacteraceae
- Genus: Massilia
- Species: M. alkalitolerans

Binomial name
- Massilia alkalitolerans (Xu et al. 2005) Kämpfer et al. 2011

Type strain
- CCTCC AA 204003, CCUG 50882, CIP 108793, DSM 17462, KCTC 12194, YIM 31775

Synonyms
- Naxibacter alkalitolerans

= Massilia alkalitolerans =

Species of bacterium

Massilia alkalitolerans is a Gram-negative, rod-shaped, non-spore-forming bacterium from the genus Massilia and the family Oxalobacteraceae.
