= Oxalicibacterium faecigallinarum =

Scientific classification
- Domain: Bacteria
- Kingdom: Pseudomonadati
- Phylum: Pseudomonadota
- Class: Betaproteobacteria
- Order: Burkholderiales
- Family: Oxalobacteraceae
- Genus: Oxalicibacterium
- Species: O. faecigallinarum

Binomial name
- Oxalicibacterium faecigallinarum Sahin et al. 2009, sp. nov.

Type strain
- CCM 2767, DSM 21641, T.S. Chandra YOx, YOx

Species of bacterium

Oxalicibacterium faecigallinarum is a Gram-negative, rod-shaped, non-spore-forming, yellow-pigmented, oxidase and catalase positive, and oxalotrophic bacterium from the genus Oxalicibacterium and family Oxalobacteraceae.
