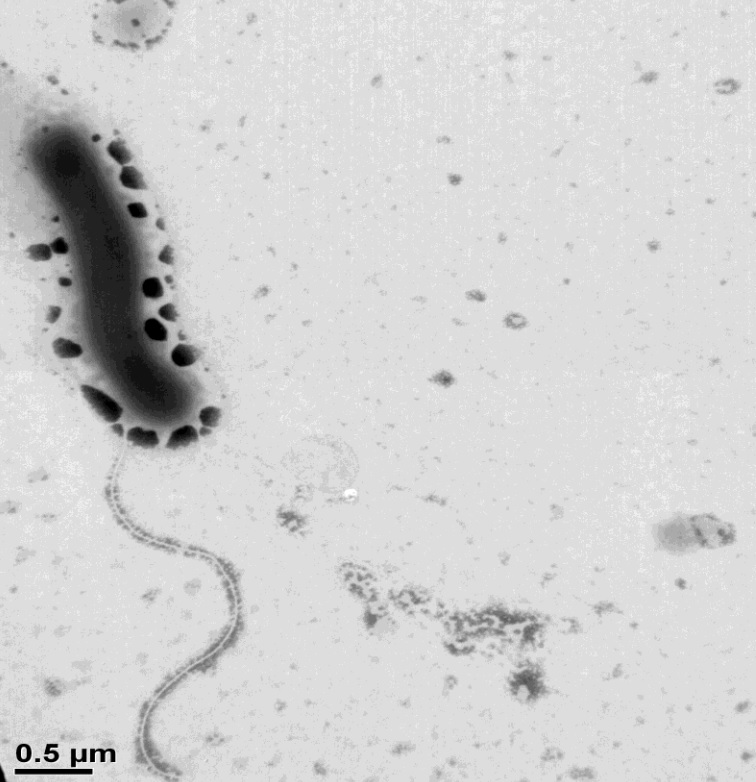
- Noviherbaspirillum agri

Scientific classification
- Domain: Bacteria
- Kingdom: Pseudomonadati
- Phylum: Pseudomonadota
- Class: Betaproteobacteria
- Order: Burkholderiales
- Family: Oxalobacteraceae
- Genus: Noviherbaspirillum
- Species: N. agri

Binomial name
- Noviherbaspirillum agri Chaudhary and Kim 2017

Type strain
- K-1-15, JCM 31463, KACC 18909, KEMB 9005-422

= Noviherbaspirillum agri =

Species of bacterium

Noviherbaspirillum agri is a Gram-negative, rod-shaped, aerobic and motile bacterium from the genus of Noviherbaspirillum which has been isolated from grassland soil from Biratnagar in Nepal.
