= Massilia kyonggiensis =

Scientific classification
- Domain: Bacteria
- Kingdom: Pseudomonadati
- Phylum: Pseudomonadota
- Class: Betaproteobacteria
- Order: Burkholderiales
- Family: Oxalobacteraceae
- Genus: Massilia
- Species: M. kyonggiensis

Binomial name
- Massilia kyonggiensis Kim et al. 2014

Type strain
- JCM 19189, KACC 17471, KEMB 9005-031, TSA1

Synonyms
- Massilia kyongginella

Species of bacterium

Massilia kyonggiensis is a Gram-negative and rod-shaped bacterium from the genus Massilia which has been isolated from the surface of a soil sample from a forest in Suwon in Korea.
