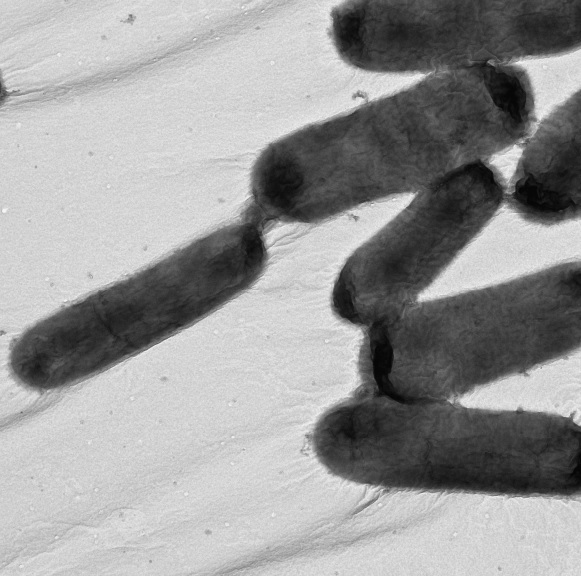

Scientific classification
- Domain: Bacteria
- Kingdom: Pseudomonadati
- Phylum: Pseudomonadota
- Class: Betaproteobacteria
- Order: Burkholderiales
- Family: Oxalobacteraceae
- Genus: Glaciimonas
- Species: G. frigoris

Binomial name
- Glaciimonas frigoris Margesin et al. 2016

Type strain
- CCOS 838, LMG 28868, strain N1-38

= Glaciimonas frigoris =

Species of bacterium

Glaciimonas frigoris is a Gram-negative, psychrophilic, rod-shaped and motile bacteria from the genus Glaciimonas which has been isolated from the permafrost from Siberia. Glasciimonas frigoris has been shown to grow well in temperatures ranging from -5 °C to 25 °C (23 °F to 77 °F).
