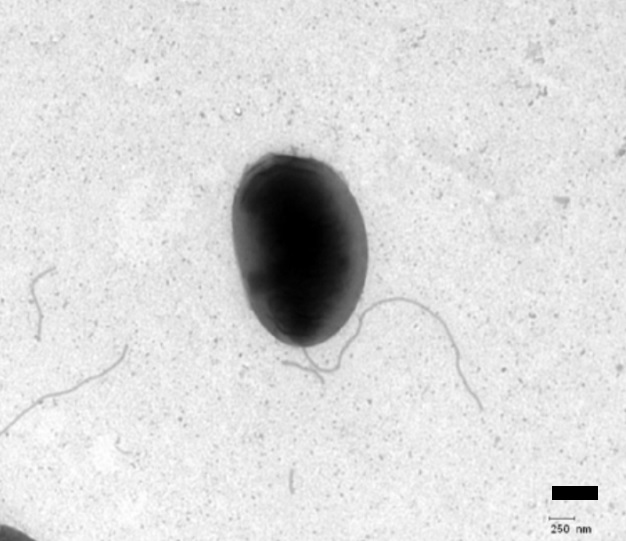

Scientific classification
- Domain: Bacteria
- Kingdom: Pseudomonadati
- Phylum: Pseudomonadota
- Class: Betaproteobacteria
- Order: Burkholderiales
- Family: Oxalobacteraceae
- Genus: Noviherbaspirillum
- Species: N. canariense

Binomial name
- Noviherbaspirillum canariense (Carro et al. 2012) Lin et al. 2013

Type strain
- CECT 7838, LMG 26151, SUEMI03

Synonyms
- Herbaspirillum canariense Novoherbaspirillum canariense

= Noviherbaspirillum canariense =

Species of bacterium

Noviherbaspirillum canariense is a Gram-negative bacterium which was isolated from old volcanic mountain soil on Tenerife on the Canary Islands. Phylogenetic analysis has shown it belongs to the genus Noviherbaspirillum. N. canariense is able to produce siderophores in vitro like N. seropedicae.
