= Massilia timonae =

Scientific classification
- Domain: Bacteria
- Kingdom: Pseudomonadati
- Phylum: Pseudomonadota
- Class: Betaproteobacteria
- Order: Burkholderiales
- Family: Oxalobacteraceae
- Genus: Massilia
- Species: M. timonae

Binomial name
- Massilia timonae La Scola et al. 2000, sp. nov.

Type strain
- CCUG 45783, CIP 105350, DSM 16850, La Scola UR/MT95, LMG 21530, UR/MT95

Species of bacterium

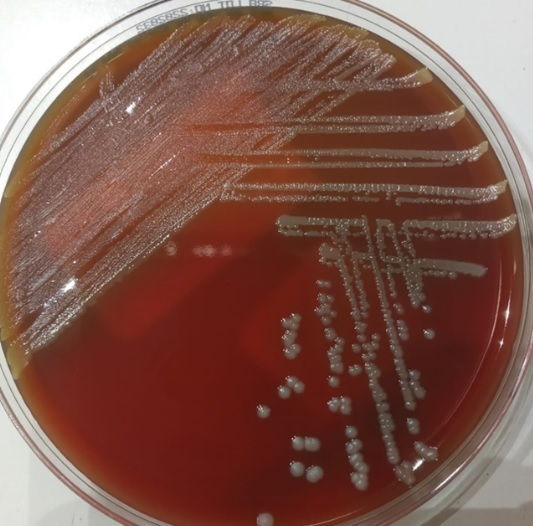
Massilia timonae blood agar

Massilia timonae is a Gram-negative, aerobic, rod-shapedbacterium from the genus Massilia and family Oxalobacteraceae, which was isolated from human patients.
