= Actimicrobium =

Scientific classification
- Domain: Bacteria
- Kingdom: Pseudomonadati
- Phylum: Pseudomonadota
- Class: Betaproteobacteria
- Order: Burkholderiales
- Family: Oxalobacteraceae
- Genus: Actimicrobium; Kim et al. 2011

Species
- A. antarcticum

Genus of bacteria

Actimicrobium is a Gram-negative, strictly aerobic and non-motile genus of bacteria in the family of Oxalobacteraceae with one known species (Actimicrobium antarcticum).
