= Herminiimonas saxobsidens =

Scientific classification
- Domain: Bacteria
- Kingdom: Pseudomonadati
- Phylum: Pseudomonadota
- Class: Betaproteobacteria
- Order: Burkholderiales
- Family: Oxalobacteraceae
- Genus: Herminiimonas
- Species: H. saxobsidens

Binomial name
- Herminiimonas saxobsidens Lang et al. 2007

Species of bacterium

Herminiimonas saxobsidens is a species of ultramicrobacteria. First reported in 2007, it was isolated from a rock surface colonized with lichens.
