= Oxalicibacterium =

Scientific classification
- Domain: Bacteria
- Kingdom: Pseudomonadati
- Phylum: Pseudomonadota
- Class: Betaproteobacteria
- Order: Burkholderiales
- Family: Oxalobacteraceae
- Genus: Oxalicibacterium; Tamer et al. 2003

Species
- Oxalicibacterium faecigallinarum; Oxalicibacterium flavum; Oxalicibacterium horti; Oxalicibacterium solurbis

Genus of bacteria

Oxalicibacterium is a genus of bacteria in the Oxalobacteraceae family.
