= Freezing =

Phase transition of liquid to solid

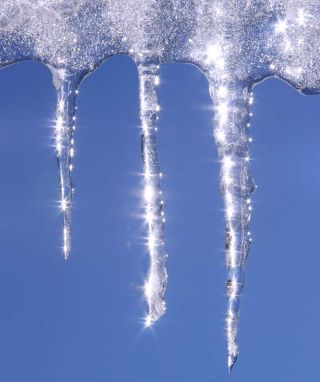
Water dripping from a slab of ice and then freezing, forming icicles

Freezing is a phase transition in which a liquid turns into a solid when its temperature is lowered below its freezing point.

For most substances, the melting and freezing points are the same temperature; however, certain substances possess differing solid-liquid transition temperatures. For example, agar displays a hysteresis in its melting point and freezing point. It melts at 85 °C (185 °F) and solidifies from 32 to 40 °C (90 to 104 °F).

== Crystallization ==
Most liquids freeze by crystallization, formation of crystalline solid from the uniform liquid. This is a first-order thermodynamic phase transition, which means that as long as solid and liquid coexist, the temperature of the whole system remains very nearly equal to the melting point due to the slow removal of heat when in contact with air, which is a poor heat conductor. Because of the latent heat of fusion, the freezing is greatly slowed and the temperature will not drop anymore once the freezing starts but will continue dropping once it finishes.

Crystallization consists of two major events, nucleation and crystal growth. Nucleation is the step wherein the molecules start to gather into clusters, on the nanometer scale, arranging in a defined and periodic manner that defines the crystal structure. Crystal growth is the subsequent growth of the nuclei that succeed in achieving the critical cluster size.

== Supercooling ==
Rapid formation of ice crystals in supercool water (home freezer experiment)

Crystallization of pure liquids usually begins at a lower temperature than the melting point, due to high activation energy of homogeneous nucleation. The creation of a nucleus implies the formation of an interface at the boundaries of the new phase. Some energy is expended to form this interface, based on the surface energy of each phase. If a hypothetical nucleus is too small, the energy that would be released by forming its volume is not enough to create its surface, and nucleation does not proceed. Freezing does not start until the temperature is low enough to provide enough energy to form stable nuclei. In presence of irregularities on the surface of the containing vessel, solid or gaseous impurities, pre-formed solid crystals, or other nucleators, heterogeneous nucleation may occur, where some energy is released by the partial destruction of the previous interface, raising the supercooling point to be near or equal to the melting point. The melting point of water at 1 atmosphere of pressure is very close to 0 °C (32 °F; 273 K), and in the presence of nucleating substances the freezing point of water is close to the melting point, but in the absence of nucleators water can supercool to −40 °C (−40 °F; 233 K) before freezing. Under high pressure (2,000 atmospheres) water will supercool to as low as −70 °C (−94 °F; 203 K) before freezing.

== Exothermicity ==
Freezing is almost always an exothermic process, meaning that as liquid changes into solid, heat and pressure are released. This is often seen as counter-intuitive, since the temperature of the material does not rise during freezing, except if the liquid were supercooled. But this can be understood since heat must be continually removed from the freezing liquid or the freezing process will stop. The energy released upon freezing is a latent heat, and is known as the enthalpy of fusion and is exactly the same as the energy required to melt the same amount of the solid.

Low-temperature helium is the only known exception to the general rule. Helium-3 has a negative enthalpy of fusion at temperatures below 0.3 K. Helium-4 also has a very slightly negative enthalpy of fusion below 0.8 K. This means that, at appropriate constant pressures, heat must be added to these substances in order to freeze them.

== Vitrification ==
Certain materials, such as glass and glycerol, may harden without crystallizing; these are called amorphous solids. Amorphous materials, as well as some polymers, do not have a freezing point, as there is no abrupt phase change at any specific temperature. Instead, there is a gradual change in their viscoelastic properties over a range of temperatures. Such materials are characterized by a glass transition that occurs at a glass transition temperature, which may be roughly defined as the "knee" point of the material's density vs. temperature graph. Because vitrification is a non-equilibrium process, it does not qualify as freezing, which requires an equilibrium between the crystalline and liquid state.

== Freezing of living organisms ==
Many living organisms are able to tolerate prolonged periods of time at temperatures below the freezing point of water. Most living organisms accumulate cryoprotectants such as anti-nucleating proteins, polyols, and glucose to protect themselves against frost damage by sharp ice crystals. Most plants, in particular, can safely reach temperatures of −4 °C to −12 °C. Certain bacteria, notably Pseudomonas syringae, produce specialized proteins that serve as potent ice nucleators, which they use to force ice formation on the surface of various fruits and plants at about −2 °C. The freezing causes injuries in the epithelia and makes the nutrients in the underlying plant tissues available to the bacteria.

=== Bacteria ===
Three species of bacteria, Carnobacterium pleistocenium, as well as Chryseobacterium greenlandensis and Herminiimonas glaciei, have reportedly been revived after surviving for thousands of years frozen in ice.

=== Plants ===
Many plants undergo a process called hardening, which allows them to survive temperatures below 0 °C for weeks to months.

=== Animals ===
The nematode Haemonchus contortus can survive 44 weeks frozen at liquid nitrogen temperatures. Other nematodes that survive at temperatures below 0 °C include Trichostrongylus colubriformis and Panagrolaimus davidi. Many species of reptiles and amphibians survive freezing.

Human gametes and 2-, 4- and 8-cell embryos can survive freezing and are viable for up to 10 years, a process known as cryopreservation.

Experimental attempts to freeze human beings for later revival are known as cryonics.

== Food preservation ==
Freezing is a common method of food preservation that slows both food decay and the growth of micro-organisms. Besides the effect of lower temperatures on reaction rates, freezing makes water less available for bacteria growth. Freezing is a widely used method of food preservation. Freezing generally preserves flavours, smell and nutritional content.

== Table ==
Phase transitions of matter
| To From | Solid | Liquid | Gas | Plasma |
|---|---|---|---|---|
| Solid | | Melting | Sublimation | ablation |
| Liquid | Freezing | | Vaporization | |
| Gas | Deposition | Condensation | | Ionization |
| Plasma | | | Recombination | |

== See also ==
- Degree of frost
- Directional freezing
- Flash freezing
- Fractional freezing
- Freezer
- Freezing air temperature
- Frost
- Micro-pulling-down
- Mpemba effect
- Phase diagram
