= Daphnia studeri =

Scientific classification
- Kingdom: Animalia
- Phylum: Arthropoda
- Clade: Pancrustacea
- Class: Branchiopoda
- Order: Anomopoda
- Family: Daphniidae
- Genus: Daphnia
- Subgenus: Ctenodaphnia
- Species: D. studeri

Binomial name
- Daphnia studeri Rühe, 1914

Synonyms
- Daphniopsis studeri

Species of microcrustacean

Daphnia studeri is a species of microcrustacean in the genus Daphnia. D. studeri lives in oligotrophic freshwater and slightly brackish lakes in Antarctica and sub-Antarctic islands.

Adult Daphnia studeri are typically 1.5 to 2.5 mm (0.059 to 0.098 in) and colorless or slightly pink.

== Taxonomy ==
Daphnia studeri was originally described in the genus Daphniopsis, but later morphological and DNA studies have placed it and the 9 other Daphniopsis species in the genus Daphnia and subgenus Ctenodaphnia.

== Distribution ==
D. studeri lives in freshwater and slightly saline lakes in Antarctica and sub-Antarctic islands. It is the only cladoceran in Antarctic lakes, but one of two microcrustaceans, alongside Acanthocyclops mirnyi.

Other species in Daphnia mostly live in salt lakes, and it is likely D. studeri historically migrated from saltwater back to freshwater.

Adult females remain active year-round, despite many Antarctic lakes being extremely oligotrophic and ice covered much of the year. The overwintering females have large lipid reserves, which is thought to help them survive in the seasons of low productivity.

== Reproduction ==
In the ultra-oligotrophic lakes, including Lake Druzhby and Crooked Lake, D. studeri produces only one or two broods per year, with one to two eggs per brood. More eggs are produced in lakes which have been enriched by bird or seal feces, allowing for higher algae production. There are no fish or other predators for D. studeri, which allows it to sustain a population with so few offspring.

== Feeding ==
D. studeri is a filter feeder, feeding primarily on algae, as well as bacteria when algae abundance is low. It grazes mostly at night, accompanied by an upward nocturnal migration.
