= Aquincola tertiaricarbonis =

Scientific classification
- Domain: Bacteria
- Kingdom: Pseudomonadati
- Phylum: Pseudomonadota
- Class: Betaproteobacteria
- Order: Burkholderiales
- Genus: Aquincola
- Species: A. amnicola

Binomial name
- Aquincola amnicola Lechner et al. 2007

Type strain
- CIP 109243, DSM 18512, L10

Synonyms
- Aquicola tertiaricarbonis

Species of bacterium

Aquincola amnicola is a MTBE-degrading, aerobic and motile bacterium from the genus of Aquincola.
