= Oxalicibacterium flavum =

Scientific classification
- Domain: Bacteria
- Kingdom: Pseudomonadati
- Phylum: Pseudomonadota
- Class: Betaproteobacteria
- Order: Burkholderiales
- Family: Oxalobacteraceae
- Genus: Oxalicibacterium
- Species: O. flavum

Binomial name
- Oxalicibacterium flavum Tamer et al. 2003, sp. nov.

Type strain
- A.Ü. Tamer TA17, CCM 7086, CCUG 48438, CIP 107889, CIP 1078896T, DSM 15506, KUEN 1580, LMG 21571, NEU 98, RSKK 3004, Sahin TA17, TA17

Species of bacterium

Oxalicibacterium flavum is a Gram-negative, rod-shaped, non-spore-forming, yellow-pigmented, and oxalotrophic bacterium from the genus Oxalicibacterium and family Oxalobacteraceae. Its 16S rRNA gene sequence analysis has shown that it belongs to the order Betaproteobacteria.
