= 3,4-dihydroxyphenylalanine oxidative deaminase =

Class of enzymes

Identifiers
- EC no.: 1.13.12.15

Databases
- IntEnz: IntEnz view
- BRENDA: BRENDA entry
- ExPASy: NiceZyme view
- KEGG: KEGG entry
- MetaCyc: metabolic pathway
- PRIAM: profile
- PDB structures: RCSB PDB PDBe PDBsum
Search
- PMC: articles
- PubMed: articles
- NCBI: proteins

3,4-dihydroxyphenylalanine oxidative deaminase (EC 1.13.12.15, 3,4-dihydroxy-L-phenylalanine: oxidative deaminase, oxidative deaminase, DOPA oxidative deaminase, DOPAODA) is an enzyme with systematic name 3,4-dihydroxy-L-phenylalanine:oxygen oxidoreductase (deaminating). This enzyme catalyses the following chemical reaction

2
L-DOPA
O_{2}
2 NH_{3}
2
3,4-dihydroxyphenylpyruvic acid

This enzyme is one of the three enzymes involved in L-dopa (3,4-dihydroxy-L-phenylalanine) catabolism in the bacterium Rubrivivax benzoatilyticus.
