= Electrofreezing =

Phase change phenomenon

Electrofreezing is the tendency of a material to solidify upon being exposed to an external electric field. Electrofreezing was initially introduced by Dufour in 1892. Examples are the electrofreezing of liquid ammonia supposed to be naturally occurring during electrical storms in Jupiter-like planets, and ice χ supposedly being a form of high pressure ice.

Depending on the material, freezing occur only at certain field intensities, above which electric fields are strong enough to induce chemical reactions.
