= P. soli =

P. soli may refer to:

- Paraburkholderia soli, a Gram-negative bacterium.
- Paraherbaspirillum soli, a Gram-negative bacterium of the genus Paraherbaspirillum.
- Parapedobacter soli, a Gram-negative bacterium.
- Pararheinheimera soli, a Gram-negative bacterium.
- Phycicoccus soli, a Gram-positive bacterium.
- Pigmentiphaga soli, a Gram-negative bacterium.
- Pontibacter soli, a Gram-negative bacterium.
- Prauserella soli, a Gram-positive bacterium.
- Pseudoflavitalea soli, a Gram-negative bacterium.
- Pseudoxanthobacter soli, a Gram-negative bacterium.
- Psychrobacillus soli, a Gram-positive bacterium.
- Pusillimonas soli, a Gram-negative bacterium.
