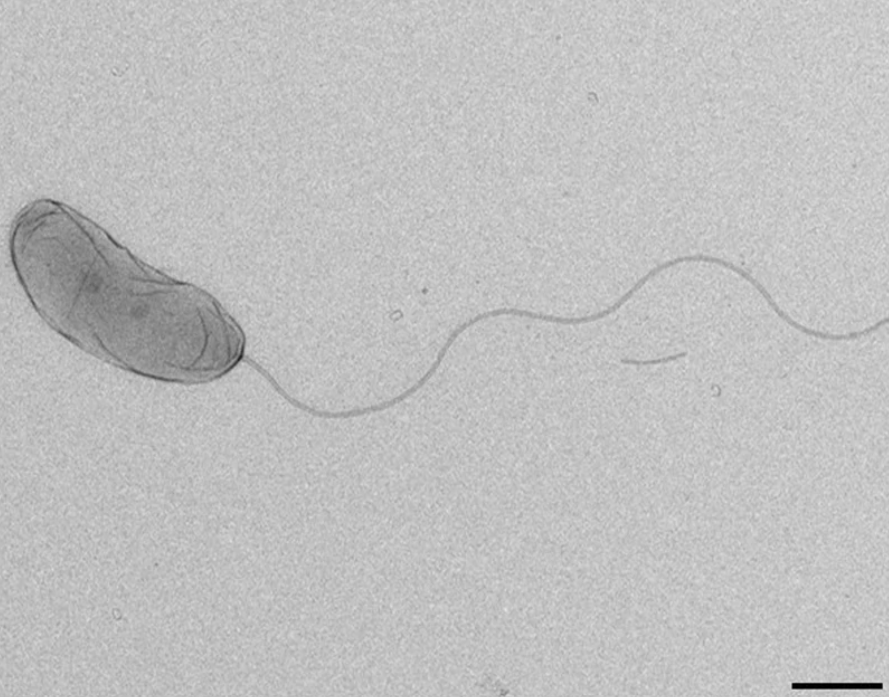
- Herminiimonas arsenitoxidans

Scientific classification
- Domain: Bacteria
- Kingdom: Pseudomonadati
- Phylum: Pseudomonadota
- Class: Betaproteobacteria
- Order: Burkholderiales
- Family: Oxalobacteraceae
- Genus: Herminiimonas; Fernandes et al. 2005

Type species
- Herminiimonas fonticola

Species
- H. aquatilis H. fonticola H. glaciei H. arsenicoxydans H. arsenitoxidans H. saxobsidens

= Herminiimonas =

Genus of bacteria

Herminiimonas is a genus of bacteria in the Oxalobacteraceae family. It contains Betaproteobacteria that have been isolated from spring and mineral waters. The type species, H. fonticola, was first recovered from the borehole of bottled mineral water in eastern Portugal.
