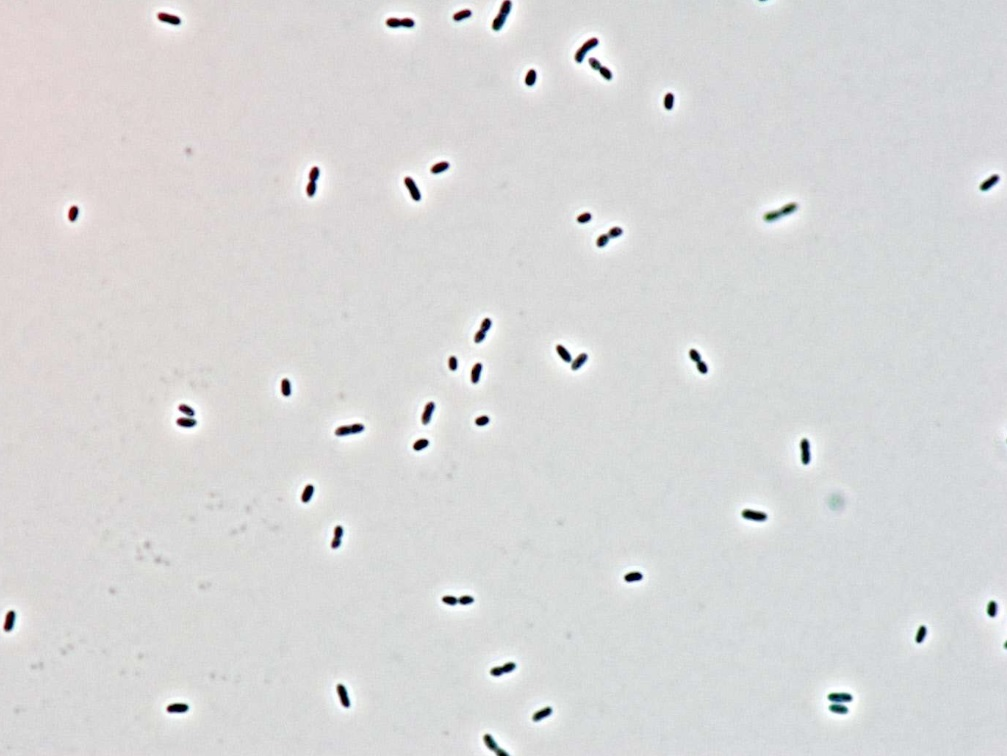
- Glaciimonas immobilis

Scientific classification
- Domain: Bacteria
- Kingdom: Pseudomonadati
- Phylum: Pseudomonadota
- Class: Betaproteobacteria
- Order: Burkholderiales
- Family: Oxalobacteraceae
- Genus: Glaciimonas; Zhang et al. 2011

Species
- Glaciimonas alpina Glaciimonas frigoris Glaciimonas immobilis Glaciimonas singularis Glaciimonas soli

= Glaciimonas =

Genus of bacteria

Glaciimonas is a genus of bacteria in the family Oxalobacteraceae. Its name comes from glaciers where it was first found and monad, a single cell. Glaciimonas = a cell from the glacier.
