= Collimonas arenae =

Scientific classification
- Domain: Bacteria
- Kingdom: Pseudomonadati
- Phylum: Pseudomonadota
- Class: Betaproteobacteria
- Order: Burkholderiales
- Family: Oxalobacteraceae
- Genus: Collimonas
- Species: C. arenae

Binomial name
- Collimonas arenae de Boer et al. 2004

Type strain
- CCUG 54727, de Boer Ter10, LMG 23964, NCCB 100031, strain P2, Ter10, Vandamme R-22719

Species of bacterium

Collimonas arenae is a bacterium of the genus Collimonas in the Oxalobacteraceae family which was isolated from seminatural grassland soils on Wadden Island near Terschelling.
