= Massilia suwonensis =

Scientific classification
- Domain: Bacteria
- Kingdom: Pseudomonadati
- Phylum: Pseudomonadota
- Class: Betaproteobacteria
- Order: Burkholderiales
- Family: Oxalobacteraceae
- Genus: Massilia
- Species: M. suwonensis

Binomial name
- Massilia suwonensis (Weon et al. 2010) Kämpfer et al. 2011, comb. nov.

Type strain
- 5414S-25, DSM 21311, KACC 12635

Synonyms
- Naxibacter suwonensis

Species of bacterium

Massilia suwonensis is a Gram-negative, rod-shaped, motile bacterium from the genus Massilia and family Oxalobacteraceae, which was isolated from air samples in the Suwon region in Korea.
