= Undibacterium =

Scientific classification
- Domain: Bacteria
- Kingdom: Pseudomonadati
- Phylum: Pseudomonadota
- Class: Betaproteobacteria
- Order: Burkholderiales
- Family: Oxalobacteraceae
- Genus: Undibacterium; Kämpfer et al. 2007

Type species
- Undibacterium pigrum

Species
- U. amnicola U. aquatile U. arcticum U. danionis U. jejuense U. macrobrachii U. oligocarboniphilum U. parvum U. pigrum U. piscinae U. seohonense U. squillarum U. terreum

Genus of bacteria

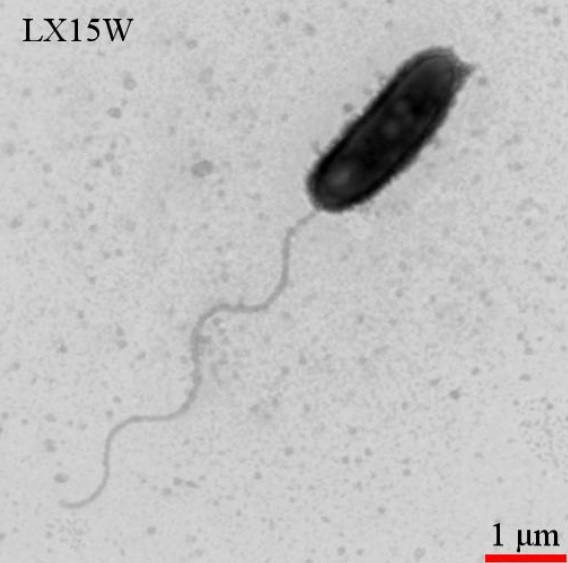
Drinking Water Bacteria

Undibacterium is a genus of Gram-negative, oxidase- and catalase-positive Betaproteobacteria in the Oxalobacteraceae family. Undibacterium bacteria occurs in drinking water.
