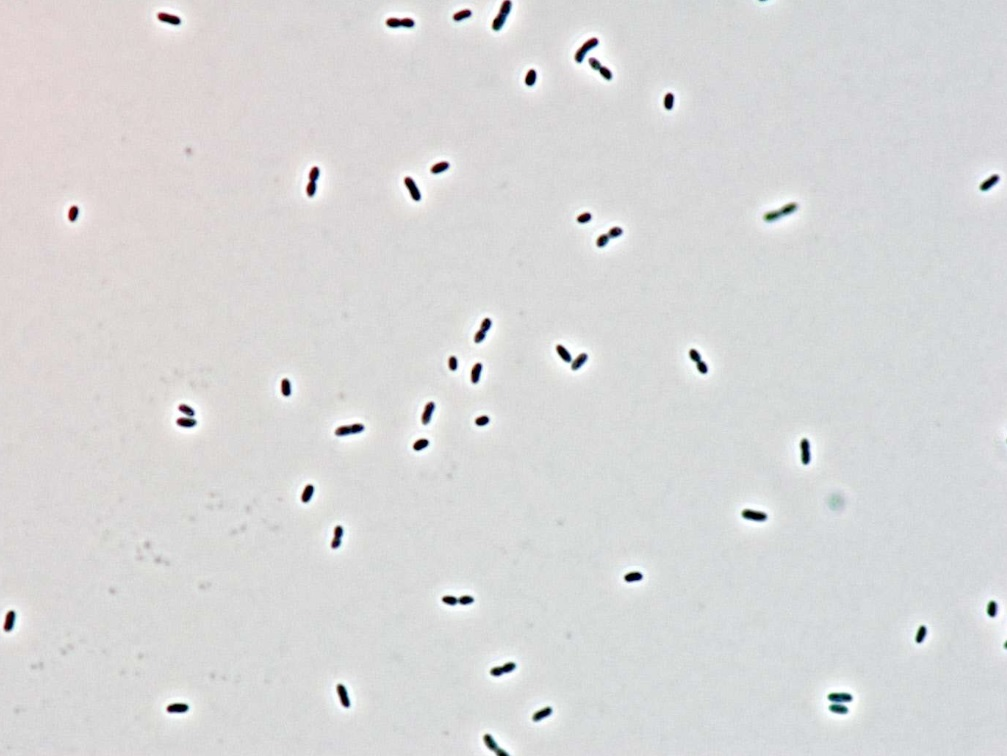

Scientific classification
- Domain: Bacteria
- Kingdom: Pseudomonadati
- Phylum: Pseudomonadota
- Class: Betaproteobacteria
- Order: Burkholderiales
- Family: Oxalobacteraceae
- Genus: Glaciimonas
- Species: G. immobilis

Binomial name
- Glaciimonas immobilis Zhang et al. 2011

Type strain
- Cr9-30, DSM 23240, LMG 25547, Margesin Cr9-30

= Glaciimonas immobilis =

Species of bacterium

Glaciimonas immobilis is a psychrophilic, nonmotile, rod-shaped, Gram-negative bacterium of the genus Glaciimonas which was isolated from alpine glacier cryoconite. Phylogenetic analysis has shown it to belong to the family Oxalobacteraceae.

== Etymology ==
Glaciimonas immobilis is composite from the Latin glacies where it was found and immobilis which means motionless.
