= Noviherbaspirillum =

Scientific classification
- Domain: Bacteria
- Kingdom: Pseudomonadati
- Phylum: Pseudomonadota
- Class: Betaproteobacteria
- Order: Burkholderiales
- Family: Oxalobacteraceae
- Genus: Noviherbaspirillum; Lin et al. 2013

Type species
- Noviherbaspirillum malthae

Species
- N. agri N. aurantiacum N. autotrophicum N. canariense N. denitrificans N. humi N. malthae N. massiliense N. psychrotolerans N. soli N. suwonense

Genus of bacteria

Noviherbaspirillum is a genus of bacteria in the family Oxalobacteraceae.
