= Aquincola amnicola =

Scientific classification
- Domain: Bacteria
- Kingdom: Pseudomonadati
- Phylum: Pseudomonadota
- Class: Betaproteobacteria
- Order: Burkholderiales
- Genus: Aquincola
- Species: A. amnicola

Binomial name
- Aquincola amnicola Chen et al. 2018

Type strain
- TTM-94, BCRC 80890, LMG 28709

Species of bacterium

Aquincola amnicola is a Gram-negative, aerobic, short rod-shaped and motile bacterium from the genus of Aquincola which has been isolated from water from the Caohu River in Taiwan.
