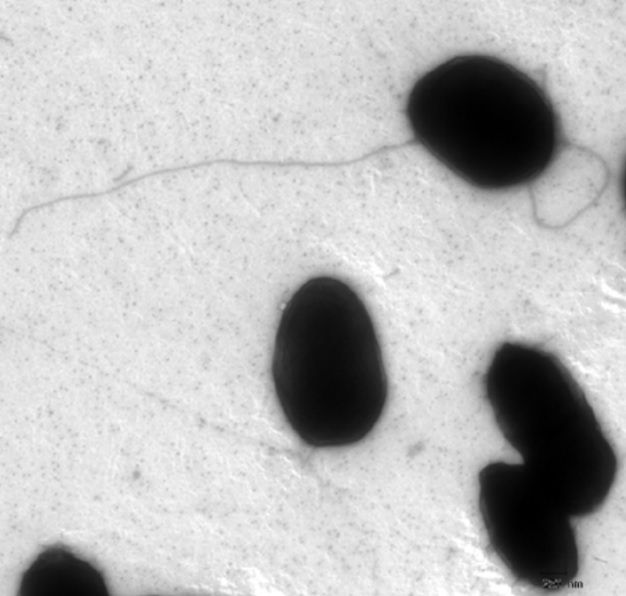

Scientific classification
- Domain: Bacteria
- Kingdom: Pseudomonadati
- Phylum: Pseudomonadota
- Class: Betaproteobacteria
- Order: Burkholderiales
- Family: Oxalobacteraceae
- Genus: Noviherbaspirillum
- Species: N. aurantiacum

Binomial name
- Noviherbaspirillum aurantiacum (Carro et al. 2012) Lin et al. 2013

Type strain
- CECT 7839, DSM 24251, LMG 26150, SUEMI08

Synonyms
- Herbaspirillum aurantiacum Novoherbaspirillum aurantiacum

= Noviherbaspirillum aurantiacum =

Species of bacterium

Noviherbaspirillum aurantiacum is a Gram-negative and motile bacterium from the genus of Noviherbaspirillum which has been isolated from old volcanic mountain soil.
