= Massilia varians =

Scientific classification
- Domain: Bacteria
- Kingdom: Pseudomonadati
- Phylum: Pseudomonadota
- Class: Betaproteobacteria
- Order: Burkholderiales
- Family: Oxalobacteraceae
- Genus: Massilia
- Species: M. varians

Binomial name
- Massilia varians (Kampfer et al. 2008) Kampfer et al. 2011

Type strain
- CCM 7478, CCUG 35299, DSM 21873, R-1482, R-3575, RSTN 96/5182, Vandamme R-3575

Synonyms
- Naxibacter varians

Species of bacterium

Massilia varians is a Gram negative, nonmotile rod-shaped, non-spore-forming, and oxidase positive bacterium Massilia and family Oxalobacteraceae, which was isolated from clinical specimens.

== Etymology ==
Its specific name comes from the Latin varians because biochemical tests have shown variable results.
