= Copiotroph =

Organism found in carbon-rich environments

A copiotroph is an organism found in environments rich in nutrients, particularly carbon. They are the opposite to oligotrophs, which survive in much lower carbon concentrations.

Copiotrophic organisms tend to grow in high organic substrate conditions. For example, copiotrophic organisms grow in Sewage lagoons. They grow in organic substrate conditions up to 100x higher than oligotrophs. Due to this substrate concentration inclination, copiotrophs are often found in nutrient rich waters near coastlines or estuaries.

== Classification and Identification ==
The bacterial phyla can be differentiated into copiotrophic or oligotrophic categories that correspond and structure the functions of soil bacterial communities.

== Interaction with other organisms ==
Copiotrophic relation between oligotrophic bacteria depends on the amount of concentration the soil has of C compounds. If the soil has large amounts of organic C, it would then favor the copiotrophic bacteria.

== Ecology ==
Copiotrophic bacteria are a key component in the soil C cycle. It is most important during the period of the year when vegetation is photosynthetically active and exudes large amounts of simple C compounds like sugar, amino acids, and organic acids. Copiotrophic bacteria are also found within marine life.

== Lifestyle ==
Copiotrophs have a higher Michaelis-Menten constant than oligotrophs. This constant is directly correlated to environmental substrate preference. In these high resource environments, copiotrophs exhibit a "feast-and-famine" lifestyle. They utilize the available nutrients in the environment rapidly resulting in nutrient depletion which forces them to starve. This is possible through increasing their growth rate with nutrient uptake. However, when nutrients in the environment get depleted, copiotrophs struggle to survive for long periods of time. Copiotrophs do not have the ability to respond to starvation. It is hypothesized that this may be a lost trait. Another possibility is that microbes never evolved to survive these extreme conditions. Oligotrophs can outcompete copiotrophs in low-nutrient environments. This causes low-nutrient conditions to continue for extended periods of time, making it difficult for copiotrophs to sustain life. Copiotrophs are larger than oligotrophs and need more energy, requiring larger concentrations of substrate for survival.

Copiotrophs are motile. Copiotrophs can have external organelles such as flagella that extend out of a microbe's cell to facilitate movement. Copiotrophs are also chemotactic, meaning they can detect nutrients in the environment. These help the microbes travel quickly to nearby food sources. Chemotaxis also enables the organism to travel away from a restricting compound. There are multiple methods for chemotaxis in these organisms. This includes the "run and tumble" strategy in which the organism randomly picks a direction to move in. However, if it senses that the concentration gradient is decreasing they stop and choose another random direction to travel in.Another strategy includes the "run and reverse" in which the organism runs towards a nutrient. If it notices the gradient decreasing, it moves back to where the gradient is larger and heads in another direction from this new position.

Through their motility and chemotaxis, copiotrophic microbes respond quickly to nutrients in their environment. With the help of these mechanisms, copiotrophs can travel to and stay in nutrient dense areas long enough for transcriptional regulatory systems to increase gene expression. This in turn helps them increase metabolic processes in high nutrient areas allowing them to maximize their growth during these patches.

== Growth characteristics ==
Copiotrophs are characterized by a high maximum growth rate. This high growth rate allows for copiotrophs to have a larger genome and cell size than their oligotrophic counterparts.

The copiotrophic genome encompasses more ribosomal RNA operons than the oligotrophic genome. Ribosomal RNA operons are linearly related to growth rate. The ribosomal RNA operons are responsible for expression of genes in clusters. The larger amount of ribosomal content allows for more rapid growth. Oligotrophs have one ribosomal RNA operon while copiotrophs can contain up to fifteen operons.

Copiotrophs tend to have a lower carbon use efficiency than oligotrophs. This is the ratio of carbon used for production of biomass per total carbon consumed by the organism. Carbon use efficiency can be used to understand organisms lifestyles, whether they primarily create biomass or require carbon for maintenance energy. Energy is necessary for the copiotrophic lifestyle which includes motility and chemotaxis. This energy could otherwise be used for biomass production. This results in a lower efficiency than the oligotrophic lifestyle which primarily uses energy for the creation of biomass.

Copiotrophs have a lower protein yield than oligotrophs. Protein yield is the amount of protein synthesized per O_{2} consumed. This is also associated with the higher ribosomal RNA operons. Overall, copiotrophs create more protein than their oligotrophic peers, however due to the copiotrophs' lower carbon use efficiency, less protein is produced per gram O_{2} consumed by the organisms.
