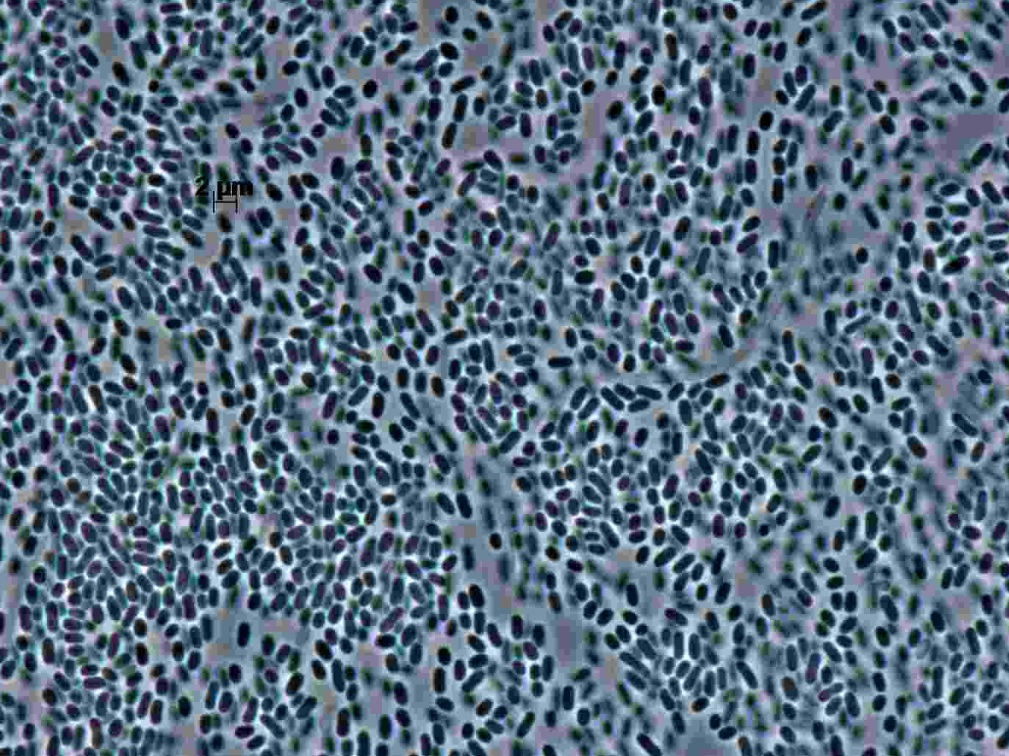
- Microscope image of Telluria mixta

Scientific classification
- Domain: Bacteria
- Kingdom: Pseudomonadati
- Phylum: Pseudomonadota
- Class: Betaproteobacteria
- Order: Burkholderiales
- Family: Oxalobacteraceae
- Genus: Telluria; Bowman et al. 1993

Type species
- Telluria mixta

Species
- Telluria chitinolytica Telluria mixta

= Telluria =

Genus of bacteria

Telluria is a genus of Gram-negative soil bacteria.
