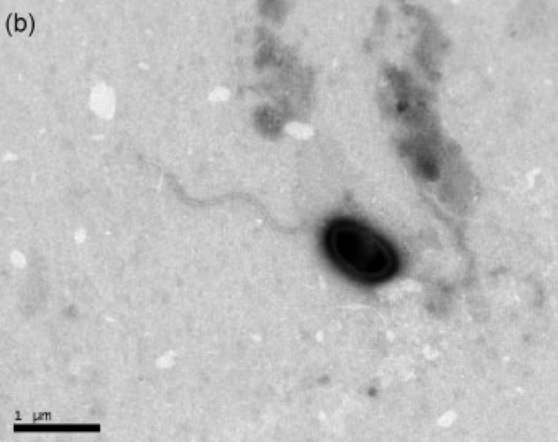
- Pseudoduganella violaceinigra

Scientific classification
- Domain: Bacteria
- Kingdom: Pseudomonadati
- Phylum: Pseudomonadota
- Class: Betaproteobacteria
- Order: Burkholderiales
- Family: Oxalobacteraceae
- Genus: Pseudoduganella; Kämpfer et al., 2012

Type species
- Pseudoduganella violaceinigra

Species
- P. violaceinigra P. danionis

= Pseudoduganella =

Genus of bacteria

Pseudoduganella is a genus of bacteria in the family of Oxalobacteraceae.
