= Aquincola =

Scientific classification
- Domain: Bacteria
- Kingdom: Pseudomonadati
- Phylum: Pseudomonadota
- Class: Betaproteobacteria
- Order: Burkholderiales
- Family: Sphaerotilaceae
- Genus: Aquincola; Lechner et al. 2007

Type species
- Aquincola tertiaricarbonis

Species
- A. amnicola A. tertiaricarbonis

Synonyms
- Aquicola

Genus of bacteria

Aquincola is a genus of bacteria from the order of Burkholderiales.
