= Paraherbaspirillum =

Scientific classification
- Domain: Bacteria
- Kingdom: Pseudomonadati
- Phylum: Pseudomonadota
- Class: Betaproteobacteria
- Order: Burkholderiales
- Family: Oxalobacteraceae
- Genus: Paraherbaspirillum; Anandham et al. 2013

Type species
- Paraherbaspirillum soli

Species
- P. soli

Genus of bacteria

Paraherbaspirillum is a gram-negative and non-spore-forming genus of bacteria in the family of Oxalobacteraceae with one known species (Paraherbaspirillum soli).
