= Collimonas =

Scientific classification
- Domain: Bacteria
- Kingdom: Pseudomonadati
- Phylum: Pseudomonadota
- Class: Betaproteobacteria
- Order: Burkholderiales
- Family: Oxalobacteraceae
- Genus: Collimonas de Boer et al. 2004

Species
- Collimonas arenae Collimonas fungivorans Collimonas pratensis

Genus of bacteria

Collimonas is a genus of bacteria in the family Oxalobacteraceae. Culturable representatives of this genus have the ability to lyse chitin, to use fungal hyphae as a source of food, to produce antifungal molecules and to weather minerals .

To date, 6 species have been described: Collimonas fungivorans, Collimonas pratensis, Collimonas arenae, Collimonas antrihumi, Collimonas humicola, Collimonas silvisoli.
