= Massilia lutea =

Scientific classification
- Domain: Bacteria
- Kingdom: Pseudomonadati
- Phylum: Pseudomonadota
- Class: Betaproteobacteria
- Order: Burkholderiales
- Family: Oxalobacteraceae
- Genus: Massilia
- Species: M. lutea

Binomial name
- Massilia lutea Zhang et al. 2006, sp. nov.

Type strain
- 101, CCTCC AB204073, CCUG 52216, CIP 109190, DSM 17473, KCTC 12345

Synonyms
- Sinobacter luteus

Species of bacterium

Massilia lutea is a Gram-negative, non-spore-forming, short rod-shaped, motile bacterium with a peritrichous flagellum from the genus Massilia and family Oxalobacteraceae.

== Etymology ==
The specific name lutea comes from the Latin lutea which means golden yellow, because of the color of its colonies.
