= Rubrivivax benzoatilyticus =

Scientific classification
- Domain: Bacteria
- Kingdom: Pseudomonadati
- Phylum: Pseudomonadota
- Class: Betaproteobacteria
- Order: Burkholderiales
- Family: Comamonadaceae
- Genus: Rubrivivax
- Species: R. benzoatilyticus

Binomial name
- Rubrivivax benzoatilyticus Ramana et al., 2006

Species of bacteria

Rubrivivax benzoatilyticus is a bacterium that can make use of light or aromatic compounds for growth. It produces brown colonies.

The aromatic compounds that can be consumed as food for this bacteria are benzoic acid, 2-aminobenzoic acid (anthranilate), 4-aminobenzoic acid, 4-hydroxybenzoic acid, phthalate, phenylalanine, trans-cinnamate, benzamide, salicylate, cyclohexanone, cyclohexanol and cyclohexane-2-carboxylate.
