= Krok Lake =

Antarctic lake

- Location within Antarctica
- Location: Antarctica
- Coordinates: 68°37′S 78°24′E
- Type: glacial lake
- Max. length: 4 nautical miles (7 km)

Krok Lake is an irregular-shaped glacial lake about 4 nautical miles (7 km) long in the southeast part of the Vestfold Hills of Princess Elizabeth Land in Antarctica. The lake was partially mapped by Norwegian cartographers from air photos taken by the Lars Christensen Expedition (1936–37) and named "Krokvatnet" (the crooked lake). It was mapped in its entirety by Australian National Antarctic Research Expeditions, utilizing air photos taken in 1957–58.
