= Chryseobacterium aquaticum =

Scientific classification
- Domain: Bacteria
- Kingdom: Pseudomonadati
- Phylum: Bacteroidota
- Class: Flavobacteriia
- Order: Flavobacteriales
- Family: Weeksellaceae
- Genus: Chryseobacterium
- Species: C. aquaticum

Binomial name
- Chryseobacterium aquaticum Kim et al. 2008

Type strain
- 10-46, CECT 7302, KCTC 12483

Synonyms
- Chryseobacterium greenlandense Loveland-Curtze et al. 2010

Species of bacterium

Chryseobacterium aquaticum is a Gram-negative, non-spore-forming and non-motile bacteria from the genus Chryseobacterium.
