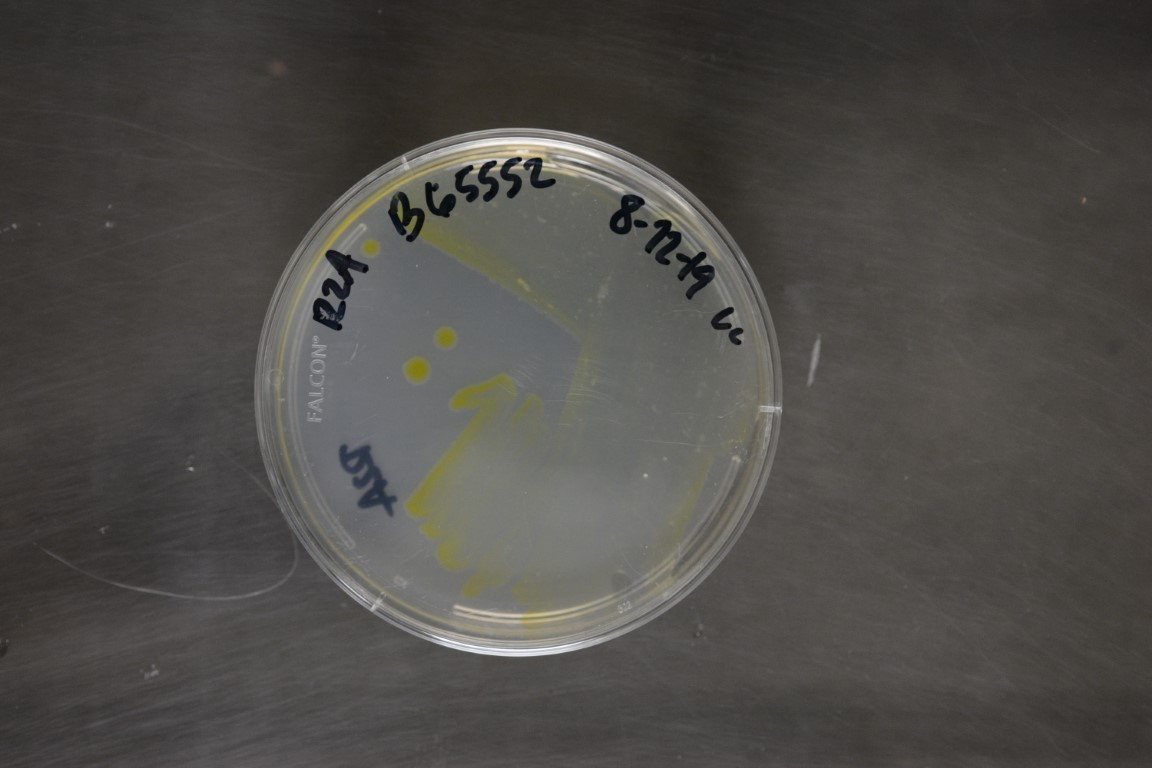
- Duganella callida on agar plate

Scientific classification
- Domain: Bacteria
- Kingdom: Pseudomonadati
- Phylum: Pseudomonadota
- Class: Betaproteobacteria
- Order: Burkholderiales
- Family: Oxalobacteraceae; Garrity et al. 2006

Genera
- Actimicrobium; Collimonas; Duganella; Glaciimonas; Herbaspirillum; Herminiimonas; Janthinobacterium; Massilia; Naxibacter; Noviherbaspirillum; Paraherbaspirillum; Paucimonas; Pseudoduganella; Oxalicibacterium; Oxalobacter; Telluria; Undibacterium "Candidatus Zinderia"

= Oxalobacteraceae =

Family of bacteria

The Oxalobacteraceae are a family of bacteria, included in the order Burkholderiales. Like all Pseudomonadota, Oxalobacteraceae are Gram-negative. The family includes strict aerobes, strict anaerobes, and nitrogen-fixing (diazotrophic) members. The cells are curved, vibroid, or straight rod-shaped.
