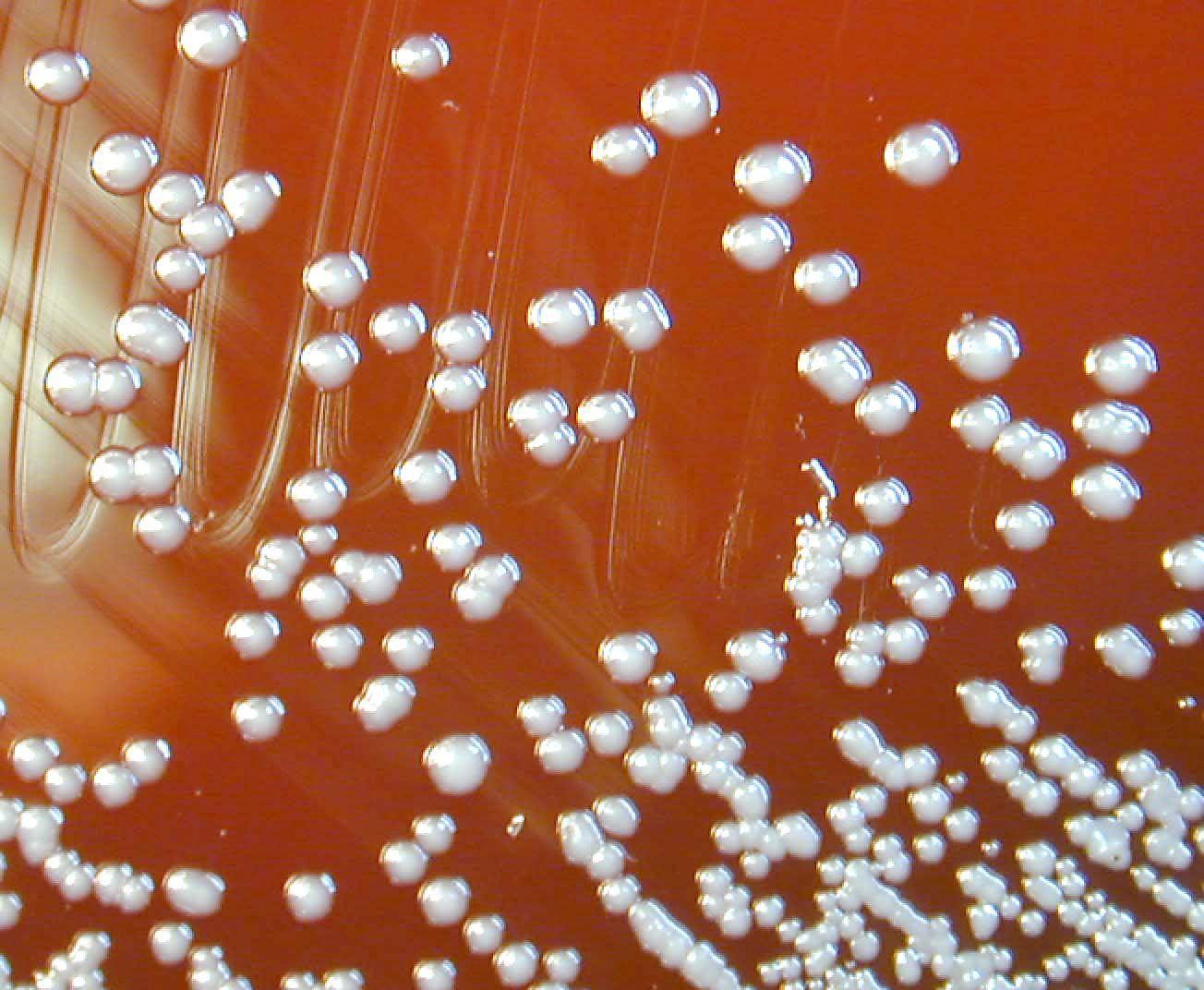
- Burkholderia pseudomallei colonies on a blood agar plate

Scientific classification
- Domain: Bacteria
- Kingdom: Pseudomonadati
- Phylum: Pseudomonadota
- Class: Betaproteobacteria
- Order: Burkholderiales; Garrity et al., 2006

Families
- Alcaligenaceae; Burkholderiaceae; Comamonadaceae; Oxalobacteraceae; Sphaerotilaceae; Sutterellaceae; Burkholderiales incertae sedis; Aquabacterium; Aquincola; Candidatus Branchiomonas; Eleftheria; Ideonella; Inhella; Leptothrix; Methylibium; Mitsuaria; Paucibacter; Piscinibacter; Piscinibacterium; Rhizobacter; Rivibacter; Roseateles; Rubrivivax; Sphaerotilus; Tepidicella; Tepidimonas; Thiobacter; Thiomonas; Xylophilus

= Burkholderiales =

Order of bacteria

The Burkholderiales are an order of Betaproteobacteria in the phylum Pseudomonadota. Like all Pseudomonadota, they are Gram-negative. They include several pathogenic bacteria, including species of Burkholderia, Bordetella, and Ralstonia. They also include Oxalobacter and related genera, which are unusual in using oxalic acid as their source of carbon. Other well-studied genera include Alcaligenes, Cupriavidus, Achromobacter, Comamonas, Delftia, Massilia, Duganella, Janthinobacterium, Polynucleobacter (important freshwater bacterioplankton), non-pathogenic Paraburkholderia, Caballeronia, Polaromonas, Thiomonas, Collimonas, Hydrogenophaga, Sphaerotilus, Variovorax, Acidovorax, Rubrivivax and Rhodoferax (both members of the photosynthetic purple nonsulfur bacteria), and Herbaspirillum (capable of nitrogen-fixation).
