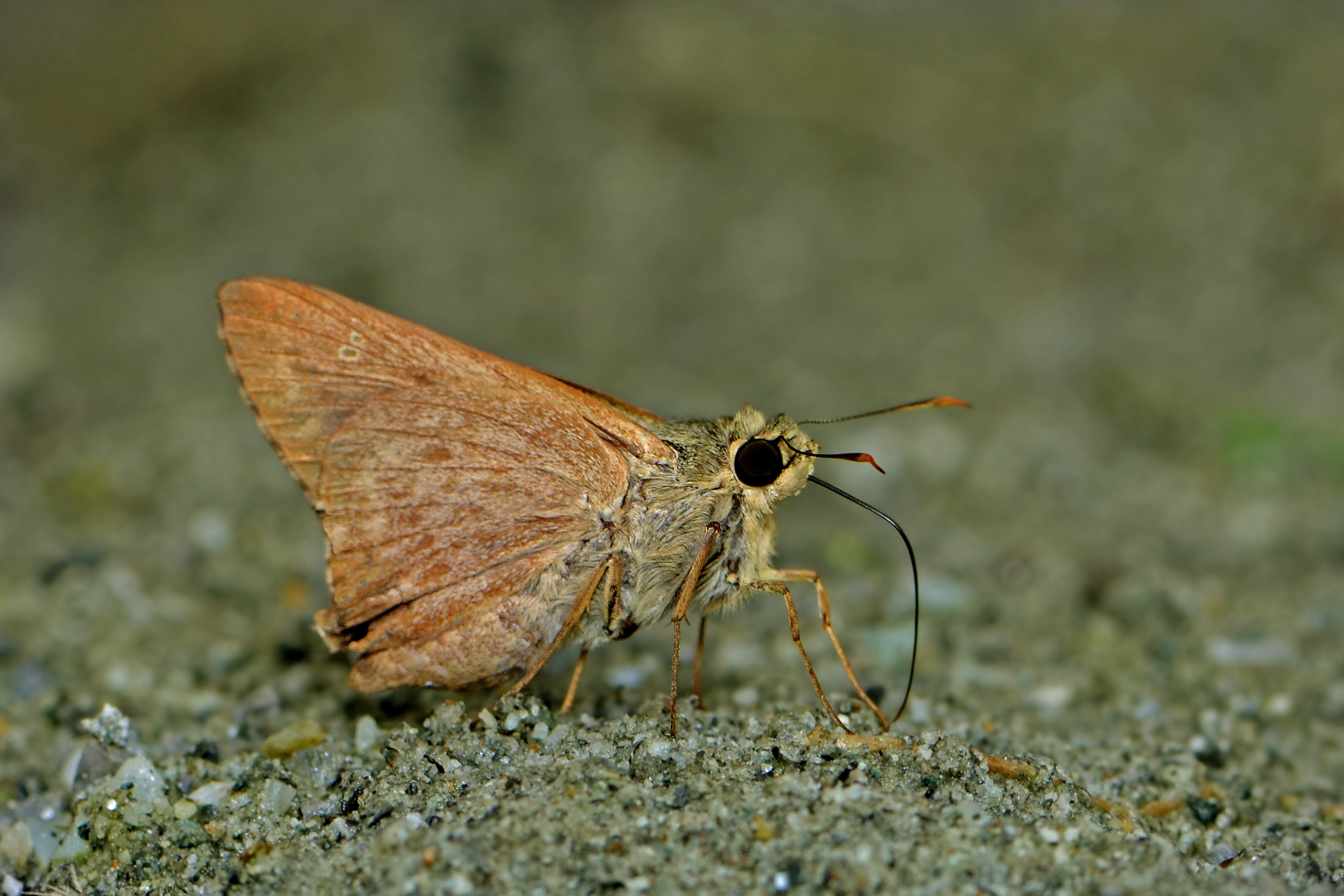

Scientific classification
- Domain: Eukaryota
- Kingdom: Animalia
- Phylum: Arthropoda
- Class: Insecta
- Order: Lepidoptera
- Family: Hesperiidae
- Genus: Pithauria
- Species: P. stramineipennis

Binomial name
- Pithauria stramineipennis Wood-Mason & de Nicéville, 1886

= Pithauria stramineipennis =

Light straw ace

Species of butterfly

Pithauria stramineipennis, the light straw ace, is a species of skipper butterfly found in tropical Asia. It measures about 2 inches (5 cm) in wingspan.

== Description ==
In describing this species James Wood-Mason and Lionel de Nicéville wrote:

In our figure the downy clothing of the upperside of the wings at the base is not represented of a sufficiently light and bright shade; it is in reality of a clear bright whitey-brown or straw-colour, which, being conspicuously contrasted with the dark margins, renders P. stramineipennis most readily distinguishable from P. murdava, in which the downy clothing is, as has already been stated, yellowish-olivaceous. The genital armature, which has been carefully examined in several specimens of each species, though identical in general plan, yet differs greatly in detail in the two. Several hundreds of specimens of each species have passed through our hands.

Male Upperside, both wings marked precisely as in Pithauria murdava, Moore, but all the setae on the base of the wings clear whitey brown with a touch of yellow on all those in front of the submedian nervure of the forewing, those on the interno-median area of this wing being concolorous with the whitey-brown down of the hindwing, the costal area of which is above more or less extensively pale brown. In P. murdava, the setae in the hindwing are yellowish olivaceous, all those of the forewing distinctly yellower; and the costal area of the hindwing is dark. All the spots and streaks of both sides are no less variable in P. stramineipennis than they are in P. murdava, so we have not attempted to describe them.

Female Differs from male in being larger, in the wings being paler, with the scanty setulose clothing at their bases greyish fuscous paler than the ground in the hindwing, and in the spots of the forewing being larger, paler, and more angular; agrees therewith in the costal area of the hindwing being pale brown above.

== Distribution ==
Pithauria stramineipennis is found in Sikkim, Bhutan, Upper Assam and Cachar.
