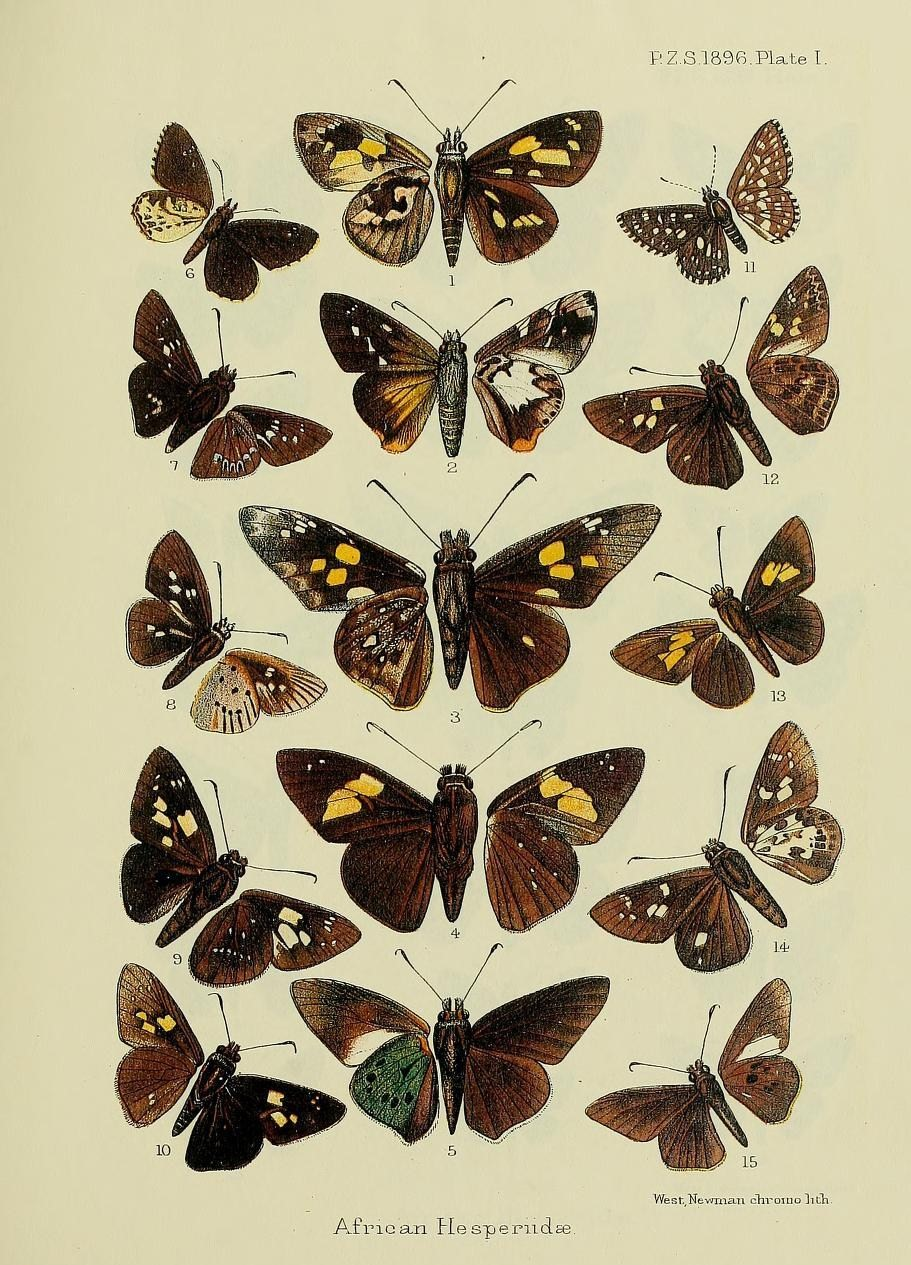
- Pteroteinon and related species in William Jacob Holland, 1896 Revision and Synonymic Catalogue of the Hesperiidae of Africa

Scientific classification
- Kingdom: Animalia
- Phylum: Arthropoda
- Class: Insecta
- Order: Lepidoptera
- Family: Hesperiidae
- Tribe: Astictopterini
- Genus: Pteroteinon; Watson, 1893

Synonyms
- Tanyptera Mabille, 1877 (preocc. Tanyptera Latreille, 1804)

= Pteroteinon =

Genus of butterflies

Pteroteinon is an Afrotropical genus of grass skipper butterflies in the family Hesperiidae.

== Species ==
- Pteroteinon caenira (Hewitson, 1867)
- Pteroteinon capronnieri (Plötz, 1879)
- Pteroteinon ceucaenira (Druce, 1910)
- Pteroteinon concaenira Belcastro & Larsen, 1996
- Pteroteinon iricolor (Holland, 1890)
- Pteroteinon laterculus (Holland, 1890)
- Pteroteinon laufella (Hewitson, 1868)
- Pteroteinon pruna Evans, 1937
