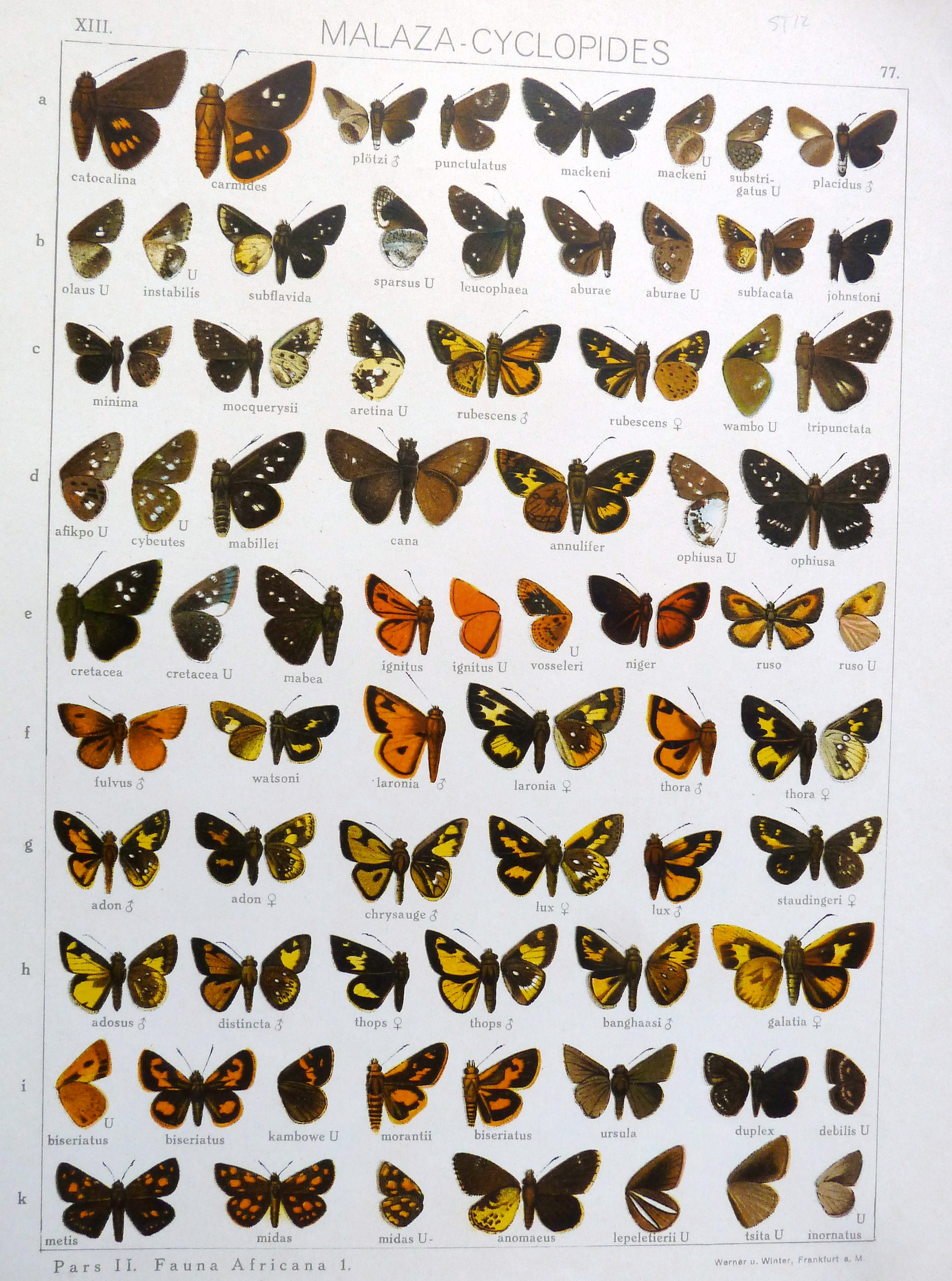

Scientific classification
- Kingdom: Animalia
- Phylum: Arthropoda
- Clade: Pancrustacea
- Class: Insecta
- Order: Lepidoptera
- Family: Hesperiidae
- Genus: Hypoleucis
- Species: H. tripunctata

Binomial name
- Hypoleucis tripunctata Mabille, 1891

Synonyms
- Hypoleucis titanota Karsch, 1893

= Hypoleucis tripunctata =

Species of butterfly

Hypoleucis tripunctata, the unmarked costus skipper, is a species of butterfly in the family Hesperiidae. It is found in Guinea, Sierra Leone, Liberia, Ivory Coast, Ghana, Togo, Nigeria, Cameroon, the Republic of the Congo, the Democratic Republic of the Congo and Uganda. The habitat consists of forests.

Adults are attracted to flowers.

The larvae feed on Aframomum latifolium and Aframomum sceptrum.

== Subspecies ==
- Hypoleucis tripunctata tripunctata (Guinea, Sierra Leone, Liberia, Ivory Coast, Ghana, Togo)
- Hypoleucis tripunctata draga Evans, 1937 (central and eastern Democratic Republic of the Congo, Uganda)
- Hypoleucis tripunctata truda Evans, 1937 (Nigeria, Cameroon, Congo)

Torben Larsen developed a species numbering system for his 2005 publication Butterflies of West Africa. The nominate subspecies is #1351. The 'Larsen' numbers have since been used with permission in A Sharp Eye on Butterflies of Ghana.
