= Pteroteinon pruna =

Scientific classification
- Domain: Eukaryota
- Kingdom: Animalia
- Phylum: Arthropoda
- Class: Insecta
- Order: Lepidoptera
- Family: Hesperiidae
- Genus: Pteroteinon
- Species: P. pruna

Binomial name
- Pteroteinon pruna Evans, 1937

Synonyms
- Pteroteinon pruna subsp. pruna; Pteroteinon pruna subsp. reali Berger, 1962

Species of butterfly

Pteroteinon pruna, commonly known as Evans' red-eye, is a butterfly in the family Hesperiidae. It is found in Guinea, Sierra Leone, Ivory Coast, Ghana, Nigeria, Cameroon, the Republic of the Congo, the Democratic Republic of the Congo and Uganda. The habitat consists of riverine forests.
