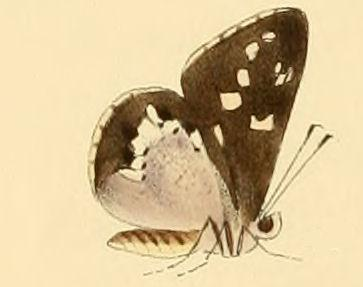

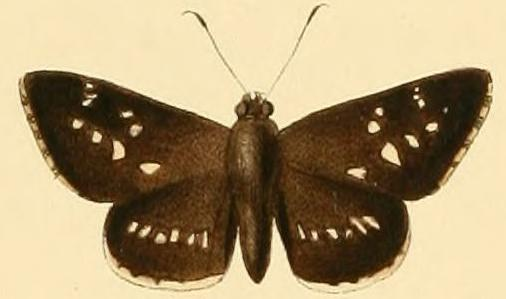

Scientific classification
- Kingdom: Animalia
- Phylum: Arthropoda
- Clade: Pancrustacea
- Class: Insecta
- Order: Lepidoptera
- Family: Hesperiidae
- Genus: Hypoleucis
- Species: H. ophiusa

Binomial name
- Hypoleucis ophiusa (Hewitson, 1866)

Synonyms
- Hesperia ophiusa Hewitson, 1866

= Hypoleucis ophiusa =

Species of butterfly

Hypoleucis ophiusa, the common costus skipper, is a species of butterfly in the family Hesperiidae. It is found in Senegal, Guinea, Sierra Leone, Liberia, Ivory Coast, Ghana, Togo, Cameroon, Gabon, the Republic of the Congo, the Democratic Republic of the Congo, Uganda, Tanzania and Zambia. The habitat consists of forests.

Adults are attracted to flowers, especially those of Costus species and gingers. Adult males are also attracted to bird droppings.

The larvae feed on Costus species, including Costus afer.

== Subspecies ==
- Hypoleucis ophiusa ophiusa (Senegal, to Cameroon, Gabon, Congo, Democratic Republic of the Congo: Mayoumbe)
- Hypoleucis ophiusa ophir Evans, 1937 (Democratic Republic of the Congo: excluding the Mayoumbe area, Uganda, western Tanzania, Zambia)

Torben Larsen developed a species numbering system for his 2005 publication Butterflies of West Africa. The nominate subspecies is #1350. The 'Larsen' numbers have since been used with permission in A Sharp Eye on Butterflies of Ghana.
