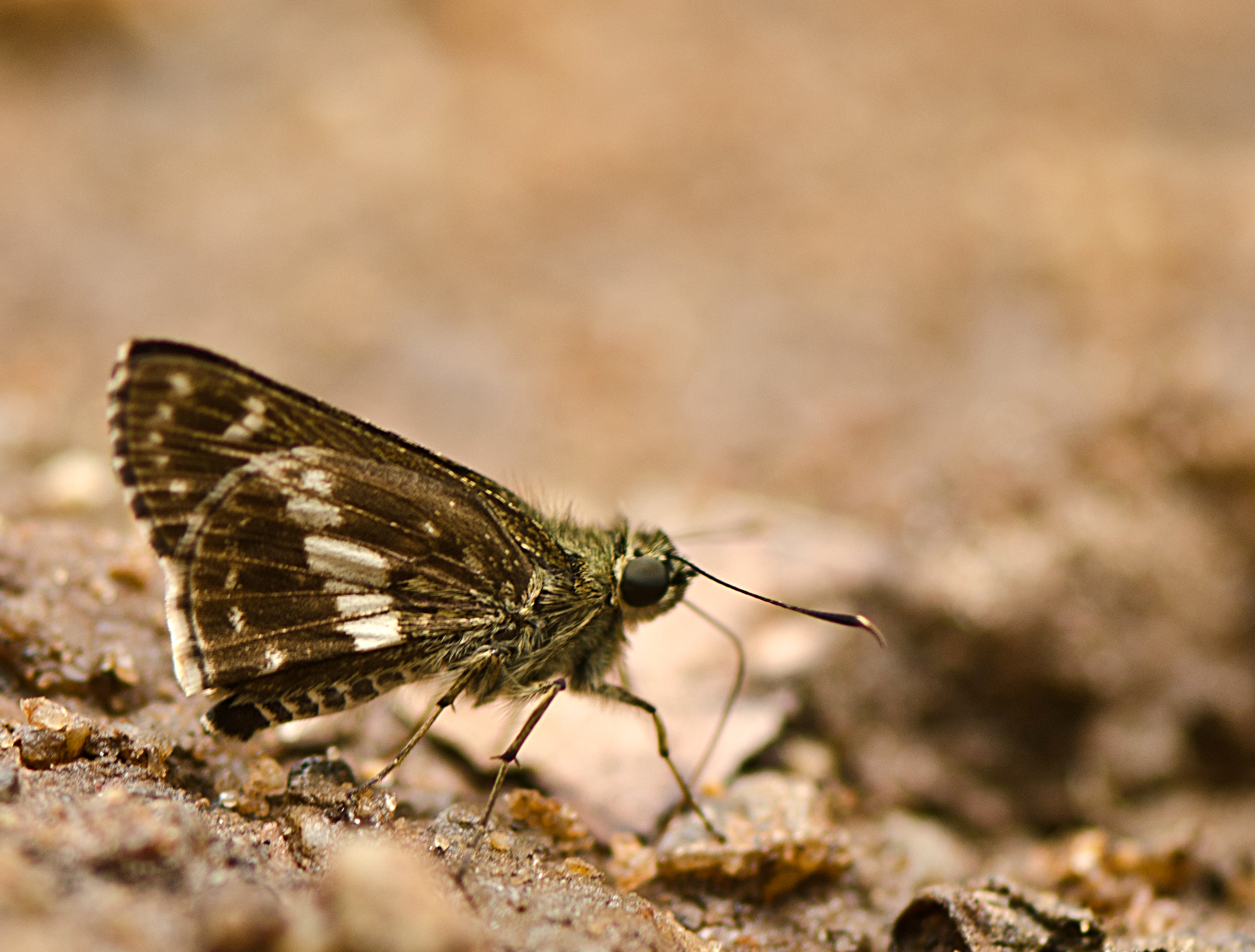

Scientific classification
- Kingdom: Animalia
- Phylum: Arthropoda
- Class: Insecta
- Order: Lepidoptera
- Family: Hesperiidae
- Genus: Halpe
- Species: H. porus

Binomial name
- Halpe porus (Mabille, 1876)

Synonyms
- Halpe moorei Watson, 1893

= Halpe porus =

Moore's ace

Species of butterfly

Halpe porus, commonly known as Moore's ace, is a species of butterfly in the family Hesperiidae, found in India.

== Description ==
Male. Upperside blackish-brown. Forewing with seven semi-hyaline spots; two within the cell towards its end, one above the other, one a little larger close to the base of the first median interspace, and a similar spot obliquely above it, near the base of the second median interspace, three small sub-apical spots in an outwardly oblique curve. Hindwing with a small, slightly suffused space, slightly yellow-tinted in the upper middle of the wing, otherwise without markings. Cilia of forewing chequered brown and greyish-white, of hindwing greyish-white, with a few brown marks on it. Underside with the ground colour slightly paler, the spots as on the upperside and a series of small white sub-marginal spots in the interspaces, the series generally complete, but in some examples one or two of them are obsolescent. Hindwing with a conspicuous discal white outwardly curved band, divided by the veins into six elongated spots, commencing from near the costa before the apex, increasing in size hindwards, largest in the middle, and extending to near the submedian vein; a small whitish spot at the end of the cell, sometimes absent, and an incomplete series of sub-marginal whitish spots, the two nearest the anal angle larger than the others which are minute; the wing sparsely covered with minute yellowish scales. Antennae black, the shaft minutely spotted with white on the underside, the club pale orange-yellow on the underside and at the tip; palpi, head and body blackish-brown, palpi and pectus beneath with white and grey hairs; abdomen whitish beneath. Female like the male, but with an extra white spot on the forewing at the middle of the sub-median vein, and all the spots larger, the pale space in the middle of the hindwing somewhat paler.

— Charles Swinhoe, Lepidoptera Indica. Vol. X

The larvae feed on Bambusa striata and Ochlandra scriptoria.
