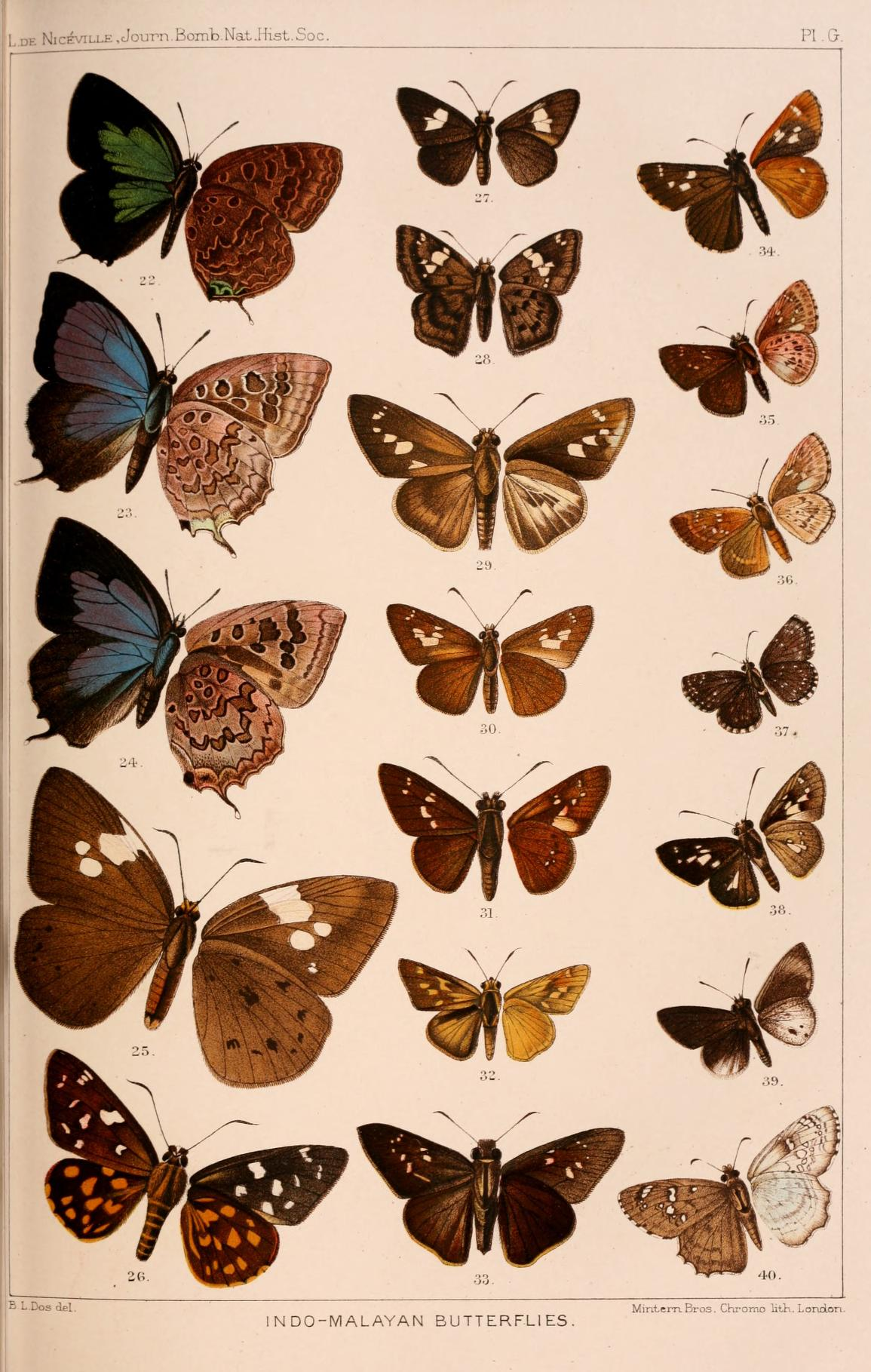
- Onryza meiktila in Lionel de Nicéville, 1891 On new and little-known butterflies from the Indo-Malayan region (figure 32)

Scientific classification
- Kingdom: Animalia
- Phylum: Arthropoda
- Class: Insecta
- Order: Lepidoptera
- Family: Hesperiidae
- Tribe: Astictopterini
- Genus: Onryza; Watson, 1893

= Onryza =

Genus of butterflies

Onryza is a genus of grass skippers in the family Hesperiidae found in China and Indochina.The genus was formed by Edward Yerbury Watson in 1893. The contained species are

- Onryza maga (Leech, 1890) China
- Onryza meiktila (de Nicéville, 1891)
- Onryza perbella Hering, 1918 (Parasovia perbella) China
- Onryza siamica Riley & Godfrey, 1925 North Burma, North Thailand, Laos
