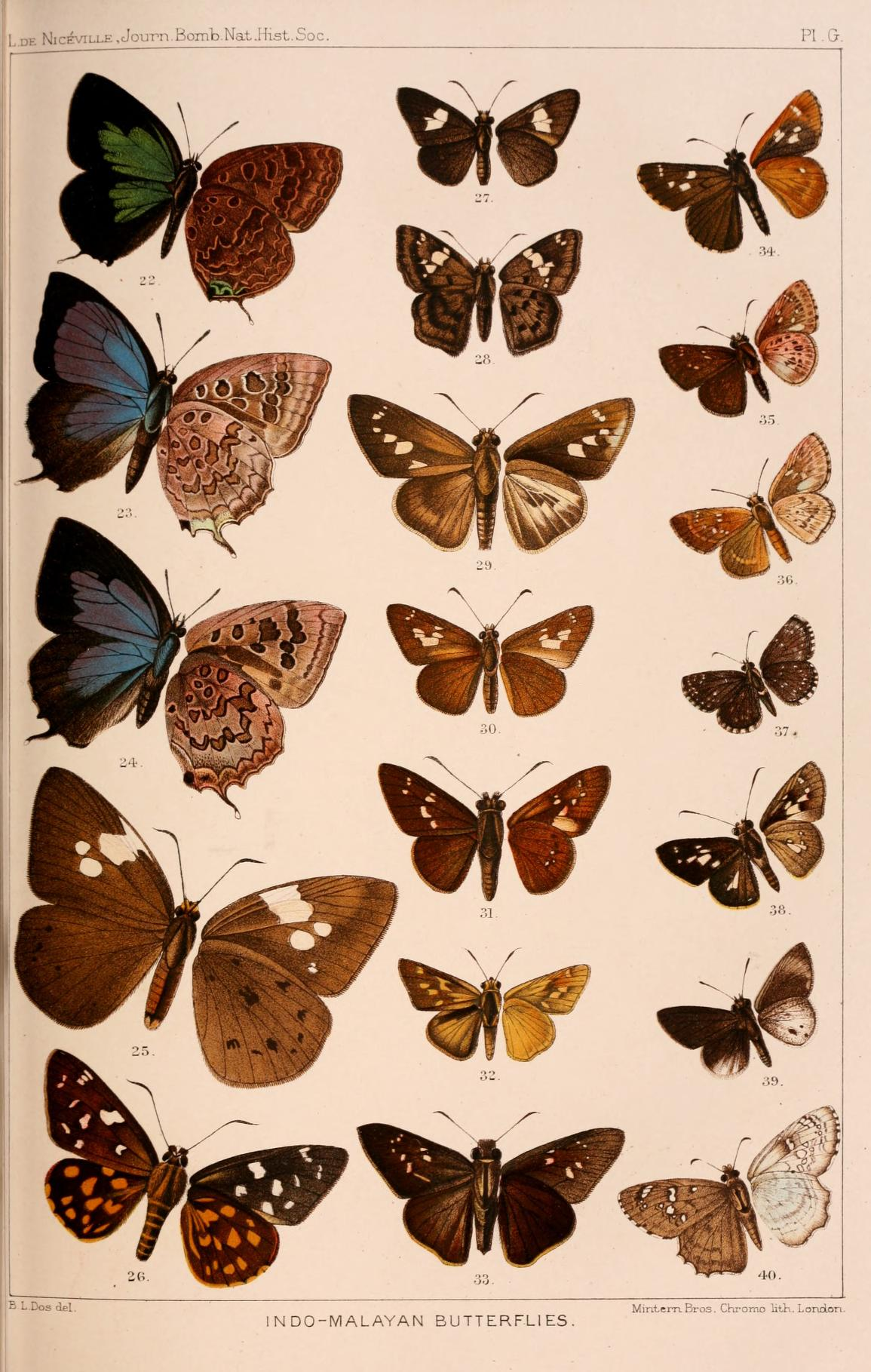
- Figure 32 from Lionel de Nicéville's 1891 "On New and Little-Known Butterflies from the Indo-Malayan Region"

Scientific classification
- Kingdom: Animalia
- Phylum: Arthropoda
- Class: Insecta
- Order: Lepidoptera
- Family: Hesperiidae
- Genus: Onryza
- Species: O. meiktila

Binomial name
- Onryza meiktila (de Nicéville, 1891)

Synonyms
- Parnara meiktila de Nicéville, 1891; Halpe meiktila de Nicéville, 1891

= Onryza meiktila =

Species of butterfly

Onryza meiktila is a butterfly in the family Hesperiidae. It was described by Lionel de Nicéville in 1891. It is found in the Indomalayan realm in Burma, Thailand and Laos.The scent-organ is formed by a tuft of long hair on the hindwing above, where they sprout forth near the base. In colour it is above blackish-brown, at the base of the hind-margin reddish-yellow with a treble spot in the cell-end and 3 postmedian ones behind it near the hind-margin, as well as 3 subapical streaks; hindwing suffused with orange-brown excepting the costal margin which exhibits the long hair-pencil above. Beneath more yellowish.
