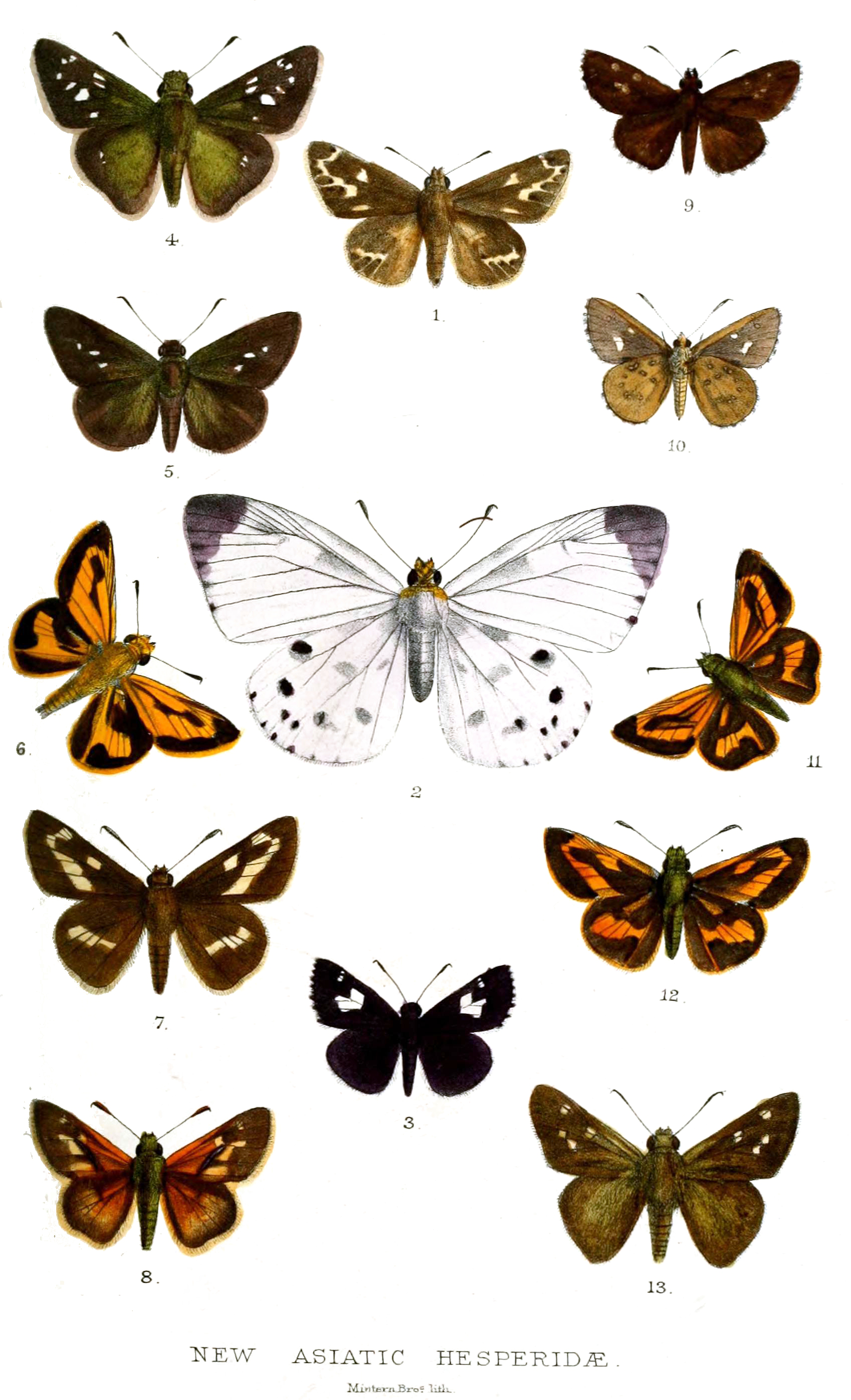
- Pithauria murdava (figure 13)

Scientific classification
- Kingdom: Animalia
- Phylum: Arthropoda
- Clade: Pancrustacea
- Class: Insecta
- Order: Lepidoptera
- Family: Hesperiidae
- Tribe: Astictopterini
- Genus: Pithauria; Moore, 1878

= Pithauria =

Genus of butterflies

Pithauria is a genus of grass skippers in the family Hesperiidae.

== Species ==
- Pithauria linus Evans, 1937
- Pithauria marsena (Hewitson, [1866])
- Pithauria murdava (Moore, [1866])
- Pithauria stramineipennis Wood-Mason & de Nicéville, [1887]
