= Fulda imorina =

Scientific classification
- Kingdom: Animalia
- Phylum: Arthropoda
- Class: Insecta
- Order: Lepidoptera
- Family: Hesperiidae
- Genus: Fulda
- Species: F. imorina

Binomial name
- Fulda imorina Evans, 1937

Species of butterfly

Fulda imorina is a species of butterfly in the family Hesperiidae. It is found in central and eastern Madagascar. The habitat consists of marshy ground, forest margins and cleared forests.
