= Ceratricula =

Ceratricula semilutea

Scientific classification
- Kingdom: Animalia
- Phylum: Arthropoda
- Class: Insecta
- Order: Lepidoptera
- Family: Hesperiidae
- Tribe: Astictopterini
- Genus: Ceratricula; Larsen, 2013
- Species: C. semilutea

Binomial name
- Ceratricula semilutea (Mabille, 1891)

Synonyms
- Ceratrichia indeterminabilis Strand, 1912; Ceratrichia semilutea Mabille, 1891

Species of butterfly

Ceratricula is a genus of butterflies in the family Hesperiidae. It is monotypic, being represented by the species Ceratricula semilutea, commonly known as the tufted forest sylph which is found in Guinea, Sierra Leone, Liberia, Ivory Coast, Ghana, Nigeria, Cameroon, Gabon, the Central African Republic, the Democratic Republic of the Congo, Uganda, north-western Tanzania and north-western Zambia. The habitat consists of forests.

Adults have been recorded feeding from low growing flowers.
