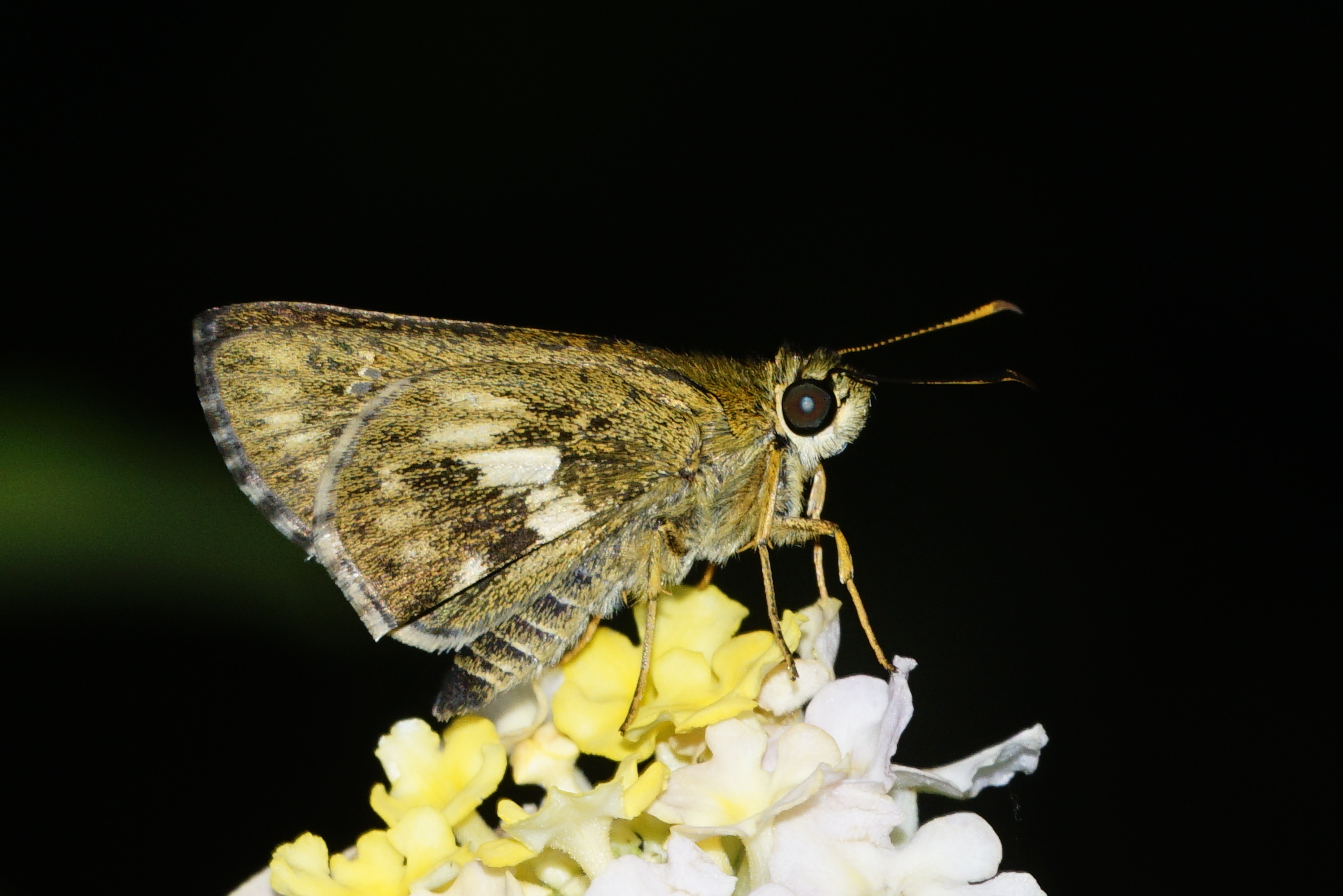

Scientific classification
- Kingdom: Animalia
- Phylum: Arthropoda
- Class: Insecta
- Order: Lepidoptera
- Family: Hesperiidae
- Genus: Halpe
- Species: H. homolea

Binomial name
- Halpe homolea (Hewitson, 1868)

= Halpe homolea =

Indian or Ceylon ace

Species of butterfly

Halpe homolea, the Indian ace or Ceylon ace, is a butterfly belonging to the family Hesperiidae.

== Description ==
Male. Upperside blackish-brown. Forewing with five or six semi-hyaline spots, one or the other of them often absent, one inside the upper end of the cell, two obliquely, in the disc, near the bases of the median interspaces, these spots are sometimes quadrate, sometimes oblong, and sometimes quite round and small, and two small sub-apical spots, sometimes a third minute spot close to the costa; in some examples (perara) all the spots are absent, except the two discal spots which are small and round, but the genitalia of all of them are said to be alike, showing them to be of one variable species. Hindwing without markings. Cilia chequered brown and ochreous-grey on the forewing, whitish on the hindwing, with some small brown marks at the vein ends. Underside a little paler and ochreous-tinted. Forewing with a dull ochreous-white streak below the basal half of the costa, the spots as above, but all tinted with ochreous, and a series of sub-marginal, more densely ochreous-tinted spots, one in each interspace, which become obsolete hindwards. Hindwing with the basal half of the wing smeared with dull greyish-ochreous, caused by minute scaling of that colour; a discal, outwardly curved series of more or less obscure, ochreous-white spots from the costa to above the sub-median vein. Cilia of both wings whitish, with brown spots opposite the vein ends; all these markings very variable, in some examples the basal greyish-ochreous suffusion is very dull and indistinct, in some it is entirely absent, and in some examples all the spots on both wings are almost entirely absent. Antennte black, the shaft spotted with ochreous-white un the uuderside, club with an orange tip; palpi, head and body blackish-brown, palpi beneath grey, pectus and abdomen whitish; legs dull pale red. Female like the male, usually somewhat paler in colour, the spots on the forewing a little larger.

— Charles Swinhoe, Lepidoptera Indica. Vol. X

== Subspecies ==
- H. h. aucma Swinhoe, 1893 - Manipur, Meghalaya, Nagaland
- H. h. hindu Evans, 1937 - Karnataka, Kerala, Tamil Nadu
- H. h. molta Evans, 1949 - Sikkim
- H. h. perfossa South, 1913 - Arunachal Pradesh

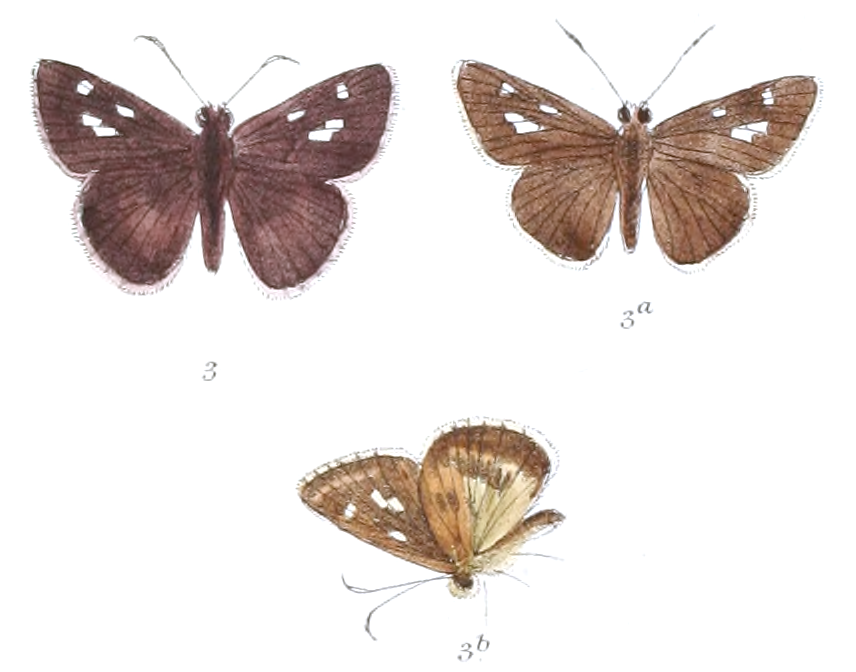

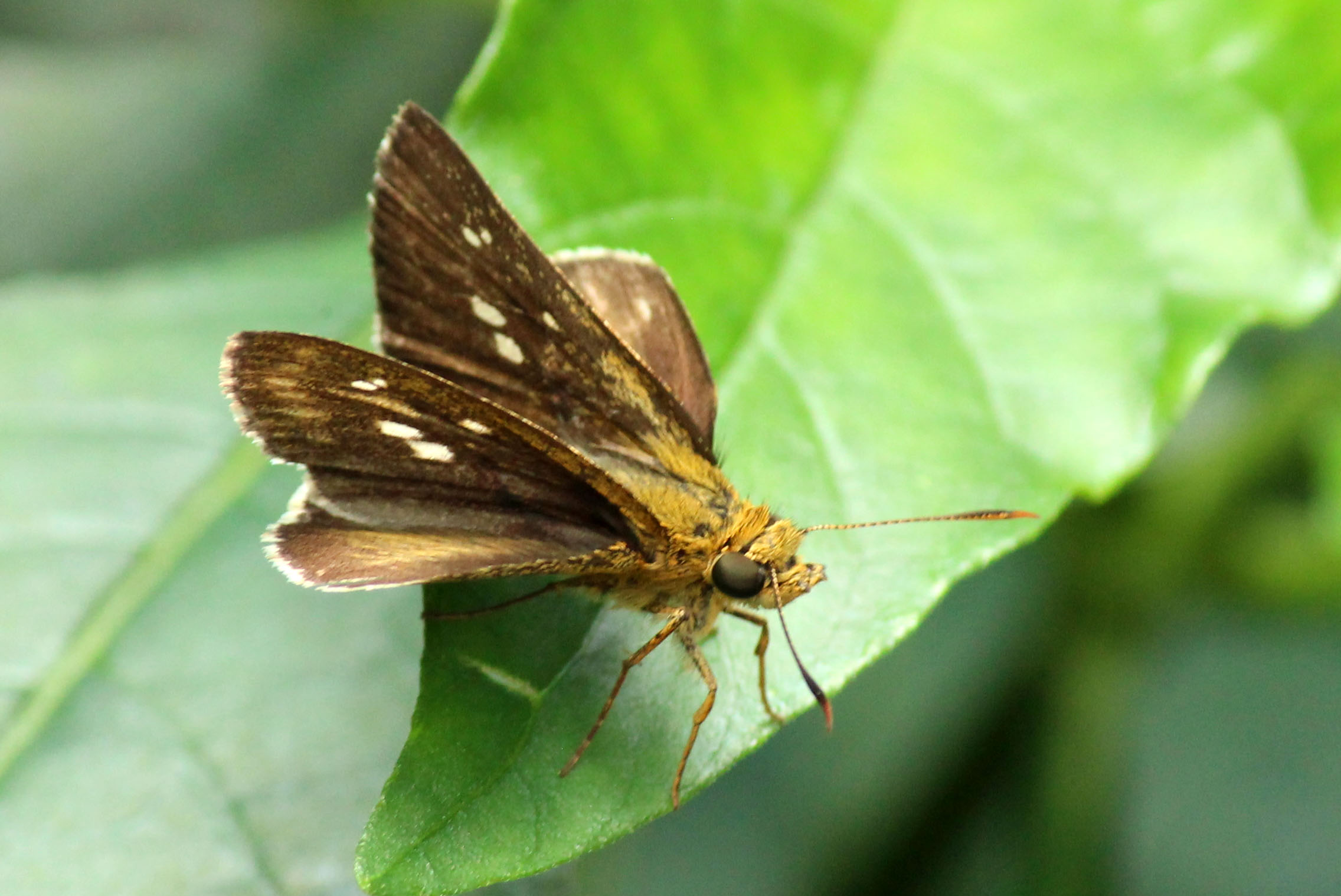
Dorsal view
