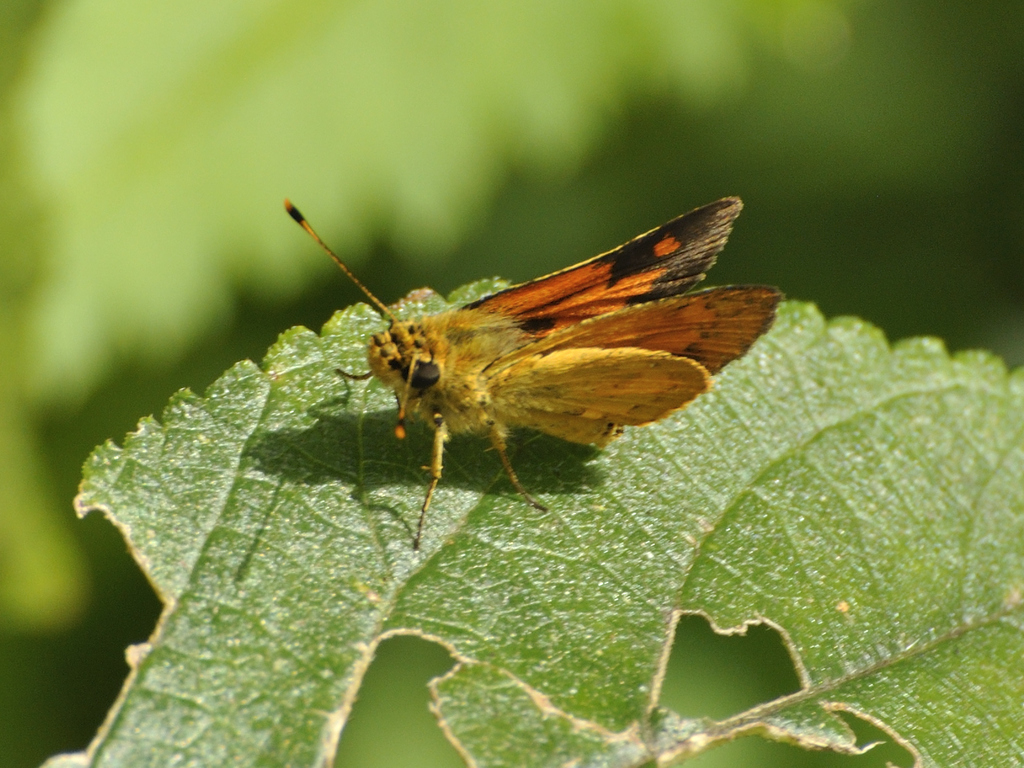

Scientific classification
- Kingdom: Animalia
- Phylum: Arthropoda
- Class: Insecta
- Order: Lepidoptera
- Family: Hesperiidae
- Genus: Fulda
- Species: F. coroller

Binomial name
- Fulda coroller (Boisduval, 1833)

Synonyms
- Hesperia coroller Boisduval, 1833; Hesperia antalcidas Felder and Felder, 1867

= Fulda coroller =

Species of butterfly

Fulda coroller is a species of butterfly in the family Hesperiidae. It is found on Madagascar. The habitat consists of forests, forest margins and cleared forests.
