= Actinor =

Veined dart

Scientific classification
- Kingdom: Animalia
- Phylum: Arthropoda
- Class: Insecta
- Order: Lepidoptera
- Family: Hesperiidae
- Subfamily: Hesperiinae
- Tribe: Astictopterini
- Genus: Actinor; Watson, 1893
- Species: A. radians

Binomial name
- Actinor radians (Moore, 1878)

Synonyms
- (Species): Halpe radians Moore, 1878

Genus of butterflies

Actinor is a Himalayan genus of butterflies in the family Hesperiidae. It is monotypic, being represented by the single species Actinor radians, the veined dart.

== Description ==
Male. Upperside luteous-brown, basal hairy scales yellow. Cilia cinereous-white: forewing with a pale-yellow constricted spot at end of the cell, and an irregular transverse continuous discal band of spots with their lower angles continued outward along the veins; hindwing with a yellow streak at end of the cell and a short discal band with outer rays. Underside paler, minutely speckled with yellowish-white; forewing as above, the hind margin being also broadly yellow; hindwing with a subbasal spot, all the veins, and two (a median and a discal) transverse sinuous bands pale yellow. Palpi, body beneath and legs yellowish-white.

— Edward Yerbury Watson, under Halpe radians 1891. Hesperiidae Indicae.

Wingspan of 1.5 inches.

== Distribution ==
The butterfly occurs from Chitral to Kumaon in the Himalayas up to 4,000 feet (1,200 m).

== Status ==
It is not rare.

== See also ==
- Hesperiidae
- List of butterflies of India (Hesperiinae)
- List of butterflies of India (Hesperiidae)
