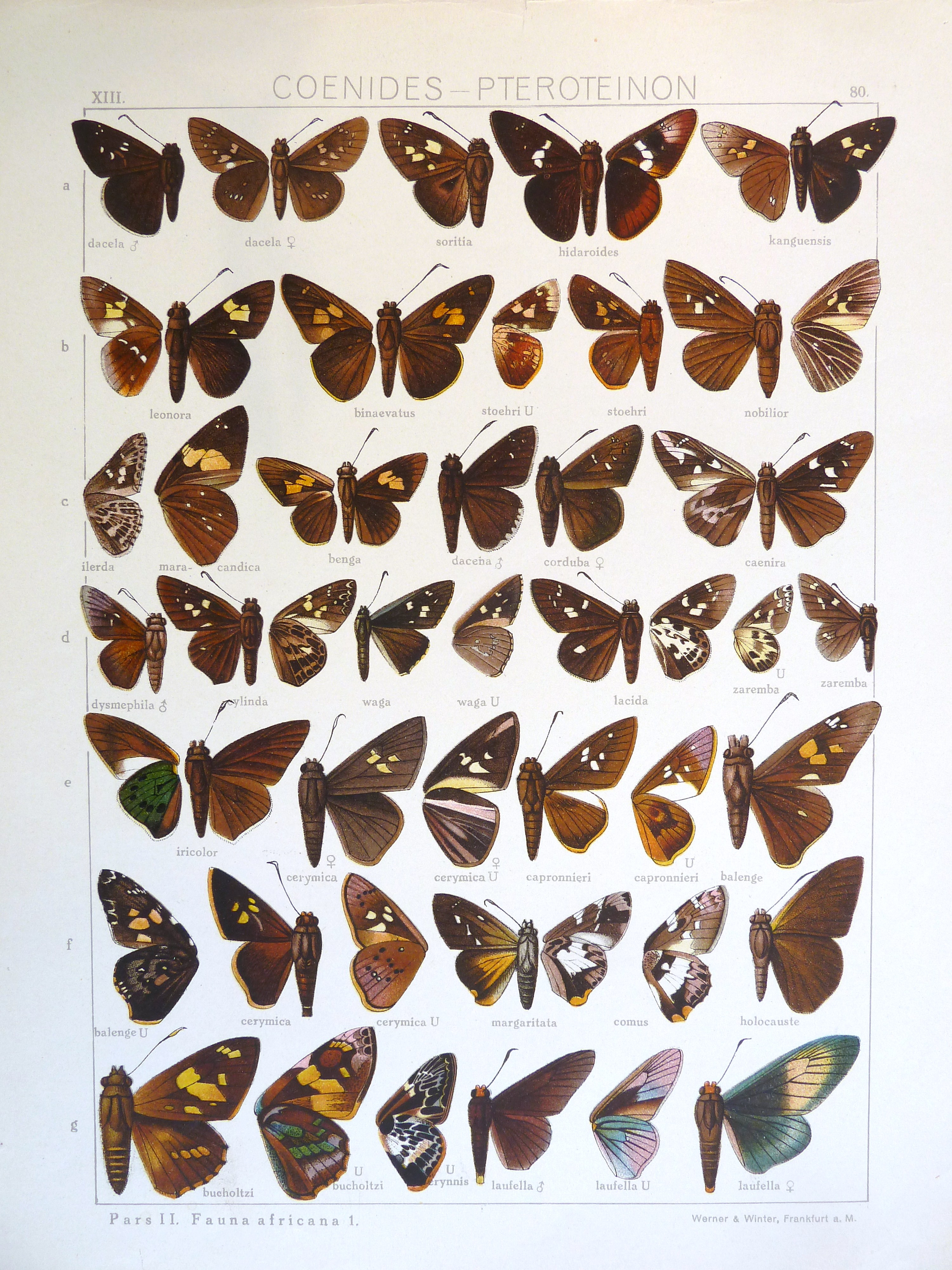

Scientific classification
- Kingdom: Animalia
- Phylum: Arthropoda
- Class: Insecta
- Order: Lepidoptera
- Family: Hesperiidae
- Genus: Hypoleucis
- Species: H. dacena

Binomial name
- Hypoleucis dacena (Hewitson, 1876)

Synonyms
- List: Hesperia dacena Hewitson, 1876; Hesperia corduba Hewitson, 1876; Proteides leucopogon Mabille, 1891; Proteides masiva Mabille and Vuillot, 1891; Caenides dacena (Hewitson, 1876)

= Hypoleucis dacena =

Species of butterfly

Hypoleucis dacena, the white-fringed recluse, is a species of butterfly in the family Hesperiidae. It is found in Guinea, Sierra Leone, Ivory Coast, Ghana, Nigeria, Cameroon, Bioko, Gabon, the Republic of the Congo, the Central African Republic, the Democratic Republic of the Congo, southern Sudan, Uganda and north-western Tanzania. The habitat consists of forests.

Adults are attracted to the flowers of Costus species.

The larvae feed on Costus afer.
