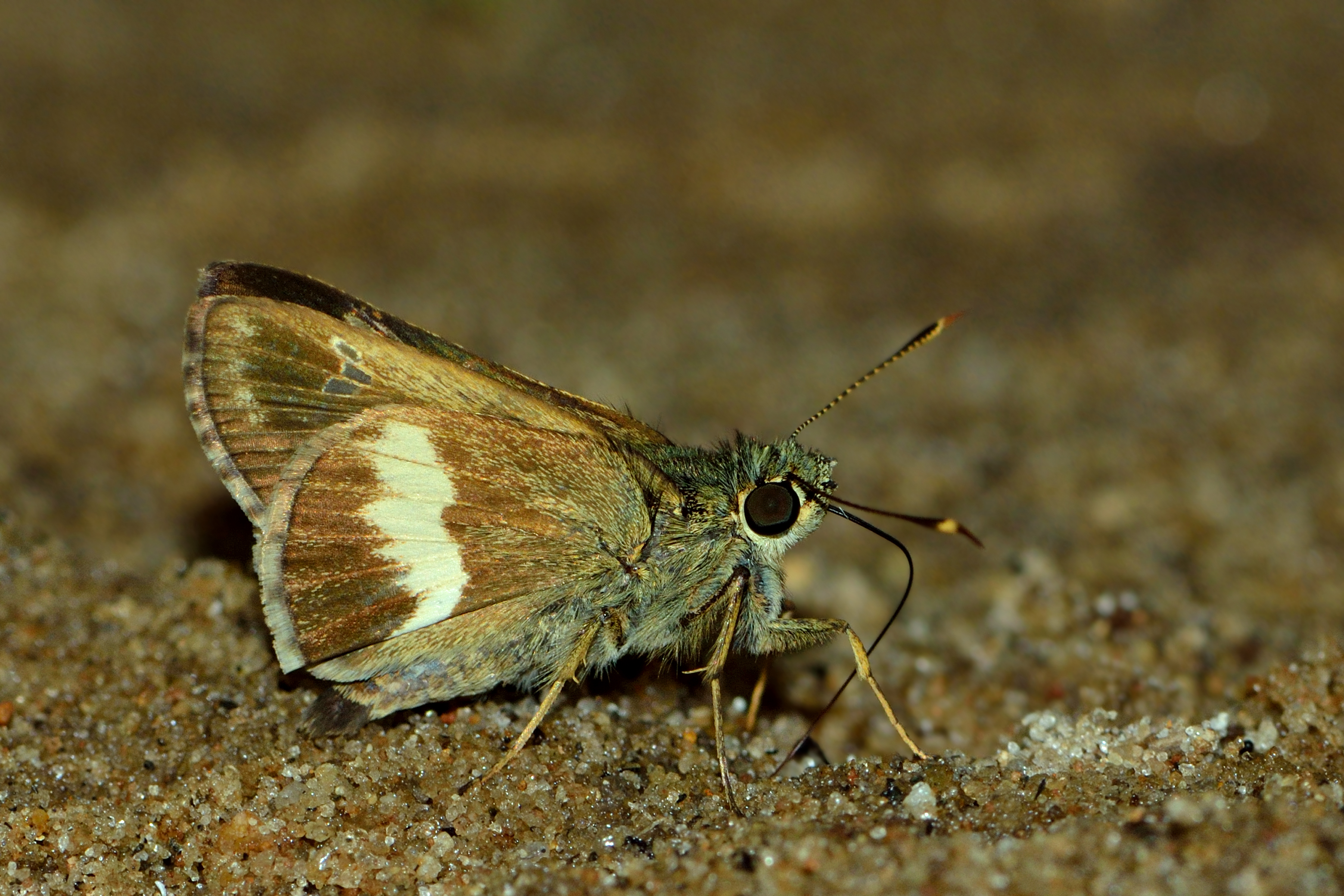
- Lateral view

Scientific classification
- Domain: Eukaryota
- Kingdom: Animalia
- Phylum: Arthropoda
- Class: Insecta
- Order: Lepidoptera
- Family: Hesperiidae
- Genus: Halpe
- Species: H. zema

Binomial name
- Halpe zema (Hewitson, 1877)

= Halpe zema =

Butterfly species

Halpe zema, the zema banded ace, is a species of skipper, a butterfly belonging to the family Hesperiidae. It is native to Nepal, India, and Myanmar.

== Taxonomy ==
The species was first described by William Chapman Hewitson in 1877.

The subspecies of Halpe zema found in India is:

- Halpe zema zema Hewitson, 1877 – Sikkim zema banded ace

== Description ==
The wingspan of Halpe zema reaches 32–35 mm (1.3–1.4 in).

Edward Yerbury Watson in his 1891 Hesperiidae Indica described the butterfly as:

Upperside dark rufous-brown. Anterior wing with six transparent white spots, one in the cell, two divided by a branch of the median nervure, and three near the apex: a black linear spot (which denotes the male) from the inner margin. Posterior wing with an indistinct central ochreous spot: the fringe white. Underside as above, except that it is rufous, that the anterior wing has the costal margin and a subapical band ochraceous, and that the posterior wing is crossed from the costal margin to the submedian nervure by a band of pale yellow.

== Distribution and habitat ==
The zema banded ace is distributed from Nepal to Arunachal Pradesh, north-east India, and Myanmar. It is also found in Sikkim, West Bengal, Assam and the northern part of Myanmar.

It is common except during the cold winter months. March to November is their approximate flight period. It is mostly found in the high hilly forest that receives heavy rainfall annually. The flight of this species is very strong and rapid with very wary movement. Males are sometimes spotted near the hill streams or wet rock. Females are rarely seen.
