= Astictopterini =

Scientific classification
- Kingdom: Animalia
- Phylum: Arthropoda
- Class: Insecta
- Order: Lepidoptera
- Family: Hesperiidae
- Subfamily: Hesperiinae
- Tribe: Astictopterini; Grishin, 2019

Genera
- see text

Tribe of butterflies

The Astictopterini are a tribe in the Hesperiinae subfamily of skipper butterflies. As most Hesperiinae have not yet been assigned to tribes, more genera may be placed here eventually.

== Species ==
Recognised genera in the tribe Astictopterini include (incomplete):

- Acada Evans, 1937
- Acleros Mabille, 1885
- Actinor Watson, 1893
- Andronymus Holland, 1896
- Artitropa Holland, 1896
- Astictopterus C. Felder & R. Felder, 1860
- Ceratricula Larsen, 2013
- Dotta Grishin, 2019
- Eogenes Mabille, 1909
- Fresna Evans, 1937
- Fulda Evans, 1937
- Galerga Mabille, 1898
- Gorgyra Holland, 1896
- Halpe Moore, 1878
- Hollandus Larsen and Collins, 2015
- Hypoleucis Mabille, 1891
- Isoteinon C.Felder & R. Felder, 1862
- Lennia Grishin, 2022
- Lissia Grishin, 2019
- Nervia Grishin, 2019
- Onryza
- Pithauria
- Thoressa
- Trida Grishin, 2022
- Xanthonymus Grishin, 2019
