= Pteroteinon concaenira =

Scientific classification
- Kingdom: Animalia
- Phylum: Arthropoda
- Clade: Pancrustacea
- Class: Insecta
- Order: Lepidoptera
- Family: Hesperiidae
- Genus: Pteroteinon
- Species: P. concaenira

Binomial name
- Pteroteinon concaenira Belcastro & Larsen, 1996

Species of butterfly

Pteroteinon concaenira, the narrow-banded red-eye, is a butterfly in the family Hesperiidae. It is found in Ivory Coast, Ghana, Nigeria, Cameroon, the Republic of the Congo, the Central African Republic, the Democratic Republic of the Congo, western Uganda, north-western Tanzania and north-western Zambia. The habitat consists of forests.

Adults have been recorded feeding on the flowers of Mussaenda species.

The larvae feed on Raphia farinifera.
