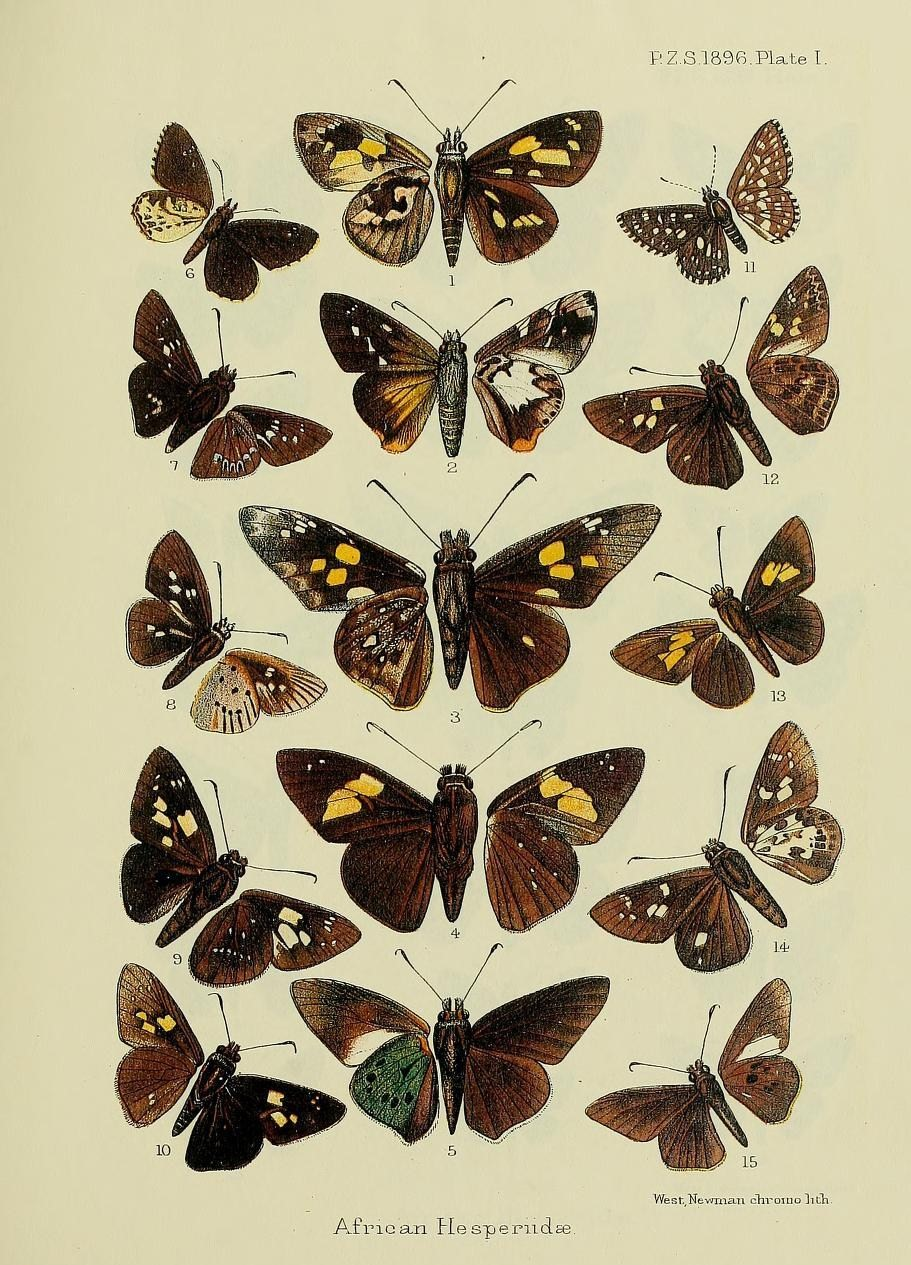
- Figure 15

Scientific classification
- Kingdom: Animalia
- Phylum: Arthropoda
- Clade: Pancrustacea
- Class: Insecta
- Order: Lepidoptera
- Family: Hesperiidae
- Genus: Pteroteinon
- Species: P. laterculus

Binomial name
- Pteroteinon laterculus (Holland, 1890)

Synonyms
- Proteides laterculus Holland, 1890

= Pteroteinon laterculus =

Species of butterfly

Pteroteinon laterculus, the brown-winged red-eye, is a butterfly in the family Hesperiidae. It is found in Ivory Coast, Ghana, Nigeria, Cameroon, Gabon, the Republic of the Congo, the western part of the Democratic Republic of the Congo and possibly Sierra Leone. The habitat consists of dense forests.
