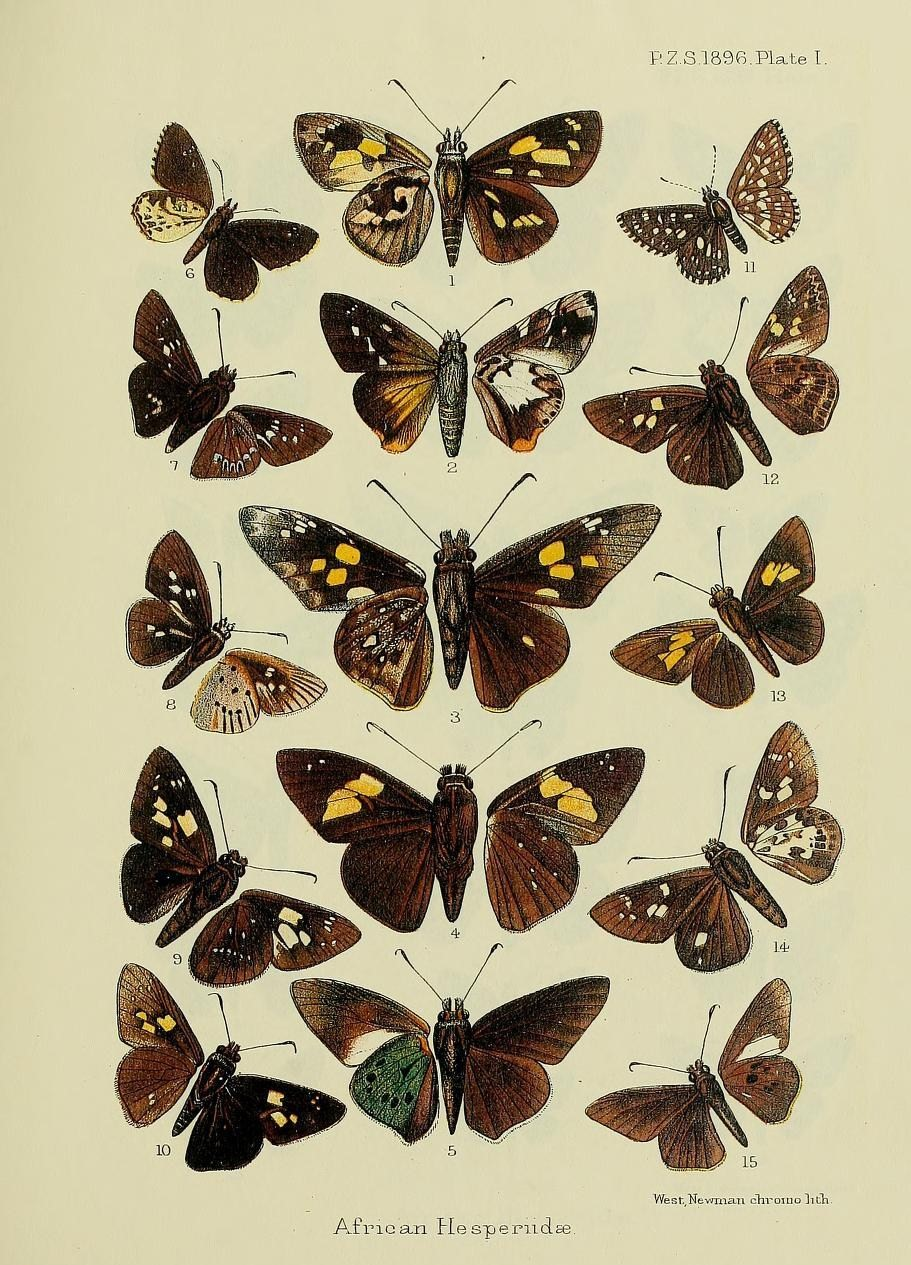
- Figure 5

Scientific classification
- Kingdom: Animalia
- Phylum: Arthropoda
- Clade: Pancrustacea
- Class: Insecta
- Order: Lepidoptera
- Family: Hesperiidae
- Genus: Pteroteinon
- Species: P. iricolor

Binomial name
- Pteroteinon iricolor (Holland, 1890)

Synonyms
- Proteides iricolor Holland, 1890

= Pteroteinon iricolor =

Species of butterfly

Pteroteinon iricolor, the green-winged red-eye, is a butterfly in the family Hesperiidae. It is found in Sierra Leone, Liberia, Ivory Coast, Ghana, Nigeria, Cameroon, Gabon, the Republic of the Congo and the central part of the Democratic Republic of the Congo. The habitat mostly consists of wet forests.

Adults have been recorded feeding on the flowers of Mussaenda species.

Torben Larsen developed a species numbering system for his 2005 publication Butterflies of West Africa. This species is #1388. The 'Larsen' numbers have since been used with permission in A Sharp Eye on Butterflies of Ghana.
