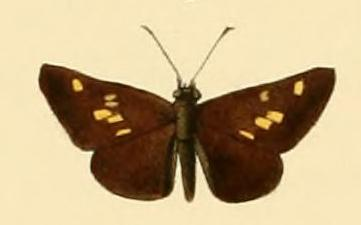

Scientific classification
- Kingdom: Animalia
- Phylum: Arthropoda
- Class: Insecta
- Order: Lepidoptera
- Family: Hesperiidae
- Genus: Fulda
- Species: F. bernieri

Binomial name
- Fulda bernieri (Boisduval, 1833)

Synonyms
- Steropes bernieri Boisduval, 1833; Cyclopides cariate Hewitson, 1868; Hesperia ypsilon Saalmüller, 1884

= Fulda bernieri =

Species of butterfly

Fulda bernieri is a species of butterfly in the family Hesperiidae. It is found on Madagascar (the east and Ile Sainte Marie). The habitat consists of forest margins and cleared forests.
