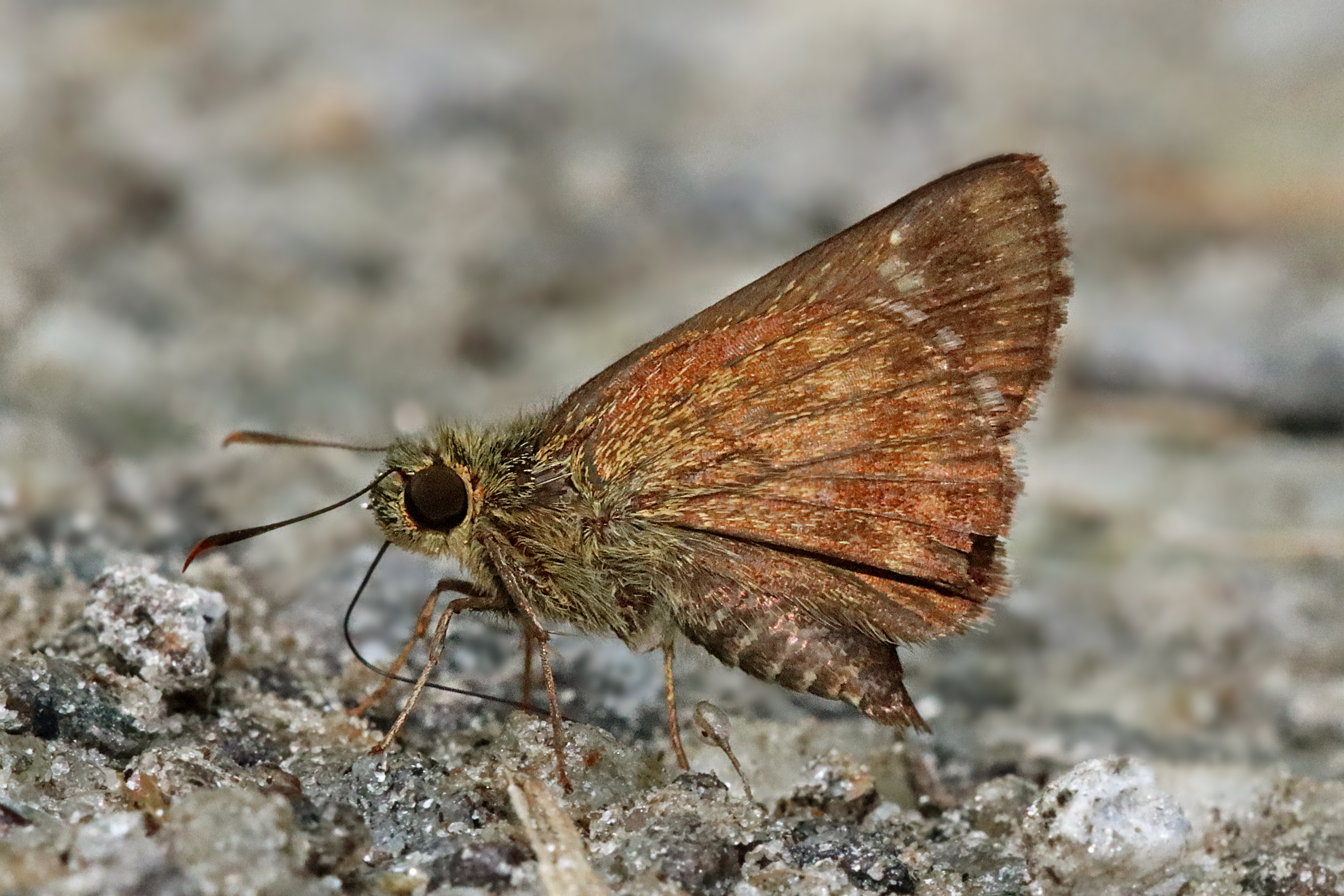
- Lateral view

Scientific classification
- Kingdom: Animalia
- Phylum: Arthropoda
- Clade: Pancrustacea
- Class: Insecta
- Order: Lepidoptera
- Family: Hesperiidae
- Genus: Halpe
- Species: H. sikkima

Binomial name
- Halpe sikkima (Moore, 1882)

Synonyms
- Halpe selangora Swinhoe, 1913

= Halpe sikkima =

Sikkim ace

Butterfly species

Halpe sikkima, also known as the Sikkim ace, is a species of butterfly in the family Hesperiidae, found in India, Myanmar, Thailand, Laos, Vietnam, China, Malaysia, and Indonesia. Its name comes from its type locality, the Indian state of Sikkim. It prefers montane forests at low elevations. Like other skippers, males can often be found at puddles drinking water.Much smaller than majuscula [Halpe beturia (Hewitson, 1868)], but otherwise above of the same colouring and marking, except that there are 1 or 2 more, extremely fine hyaline dots before the apical part resp. below the costal margin of the forewing above, which may, however, also be absent in specimens from Borneo.
