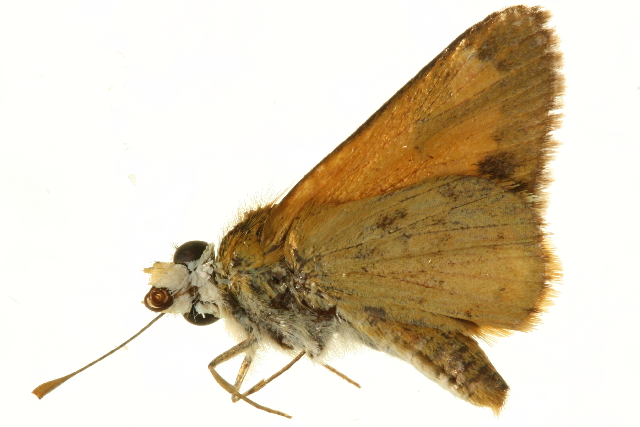

Scientific classification
- Kingdom: Animalia
- Phylum: Arthropoda
- Class: Insecta
- Order: Lepidoptera
- Family: Hesperiidae
- Genus: Fulda
- Species: F. australis

Binomial name
- Fulda australis Viette, 1956

Synonyms
- Fulda coroller australis Viette, 1956

= Fulda australis =

Species of butterfly

Fulda australis is a species of butterfly in the family Hesperiidae. It is found on Madagascar. The habitat consists of unnatural grasslands such as pastures and subarid areas.
