= Fulda lucida =

Scientific classification
- Kingdom: Animalia
- Phylum: Arthropoda
- Class: Insecta
- Order: Lepidoptera
- Family: Hesperiidae
- Genus: Fulda
- Species: F. lucida

Binomial name
- Fulda lucida Evans, 1937

Synonyms
- Fulda bernieri lucida Evans, 1937

Species of butterfly

Fulda lucida is a species of butterfly in the family Hesperiidae. It is found along the north-western coast of Madagascar. The habitat consists of unnatural grasslands such as pastures, forest margins and cleared forests.
