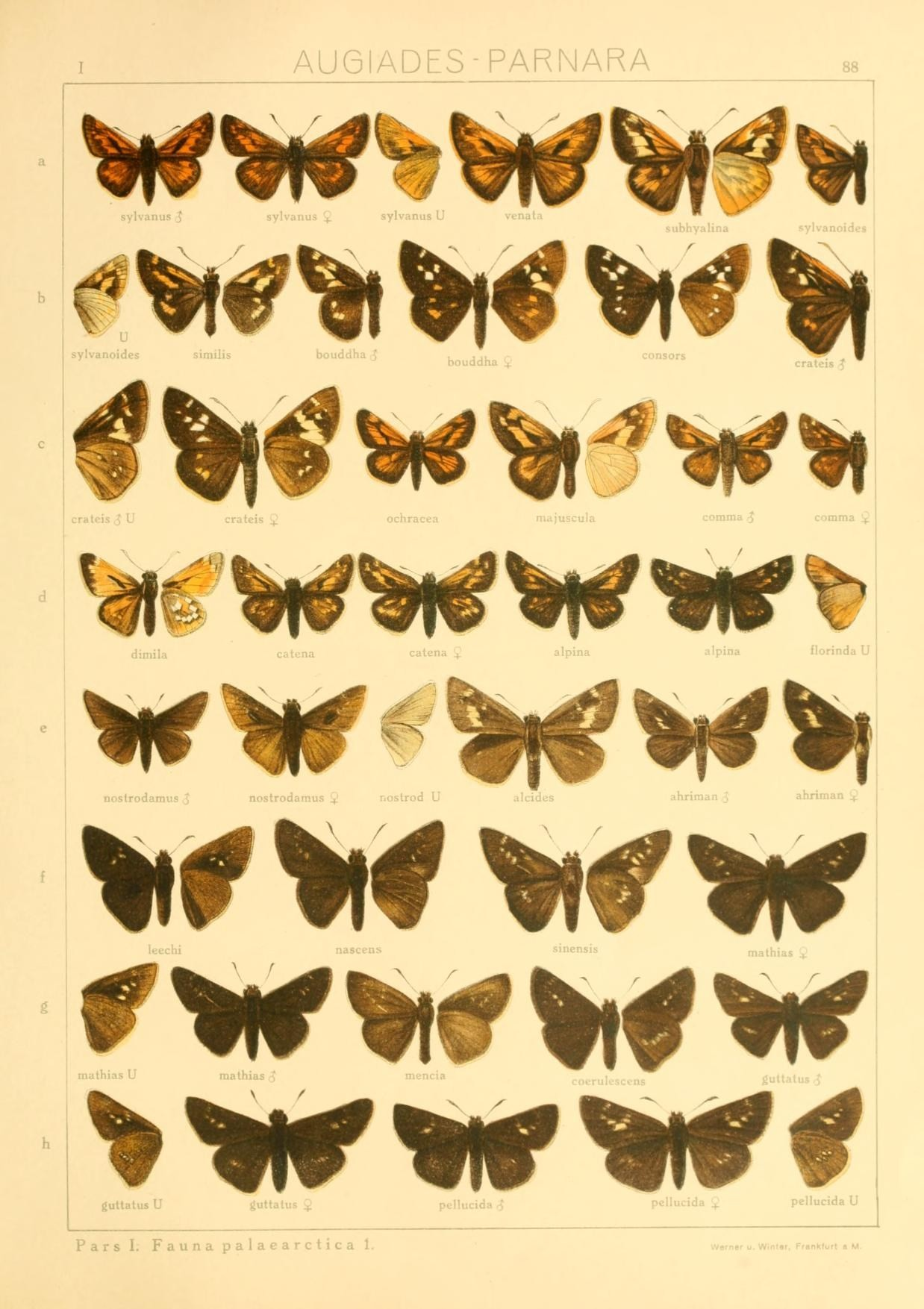
- Eogenes alcides in Seitz 88e

Scientific classification
- Kingdom: Animalia
- Phylum: Arthropoda
- Class: Insecta
- Order: Lepidoptera
- Family: Hesperiidae
- Genus: Eogenes
- Species: E. alcides

Binomial name
- Eogenes alcides Herrich-Schäffer, [1852]

= Eogenes alcides =

Species of butterfly

Eogenes alcides is a butterfly found in the East Palearctic Asia Minor to Iran, Afghanistan to Pakistan, West China. that belongs to the skippers family. Subspecies E. a. ahriman (Christoph, 1884) is found in Turkestan.

== Description from Seitz ==
Eogenes hindwing with rounded distal margin, especially in the male, the anal angle being effaced. Vein 2 of the forewing towards the middle of the cell. Antennae with ovate club, which is elongate and has no pointed tip. Third segment of palpi prominent. Male without stigma. E. alcides H.-Schaff. (88 e). Wings brown. Forewing with 3 apical dots, near which are placed beneath two more smaller ones. In the cell a large pale yellow spot, and there is a straight row of 3 spots between veins 3 and 1, the posterior spots being the largest. In the female the spots are larger and there are, moreover, 3 small pale spots below the cell of the hindwing. This wing is uniformly pale ash grey beneath. We separate this species from Parnara, as its characters do not agree with that genus. Asia Minor, Armenia. — The form E. arhimani Christ. (88 e) differs from true E. alcides only in its smaller size and the larger spots of the wings. Turkestan, near Buchara, Karategin.
