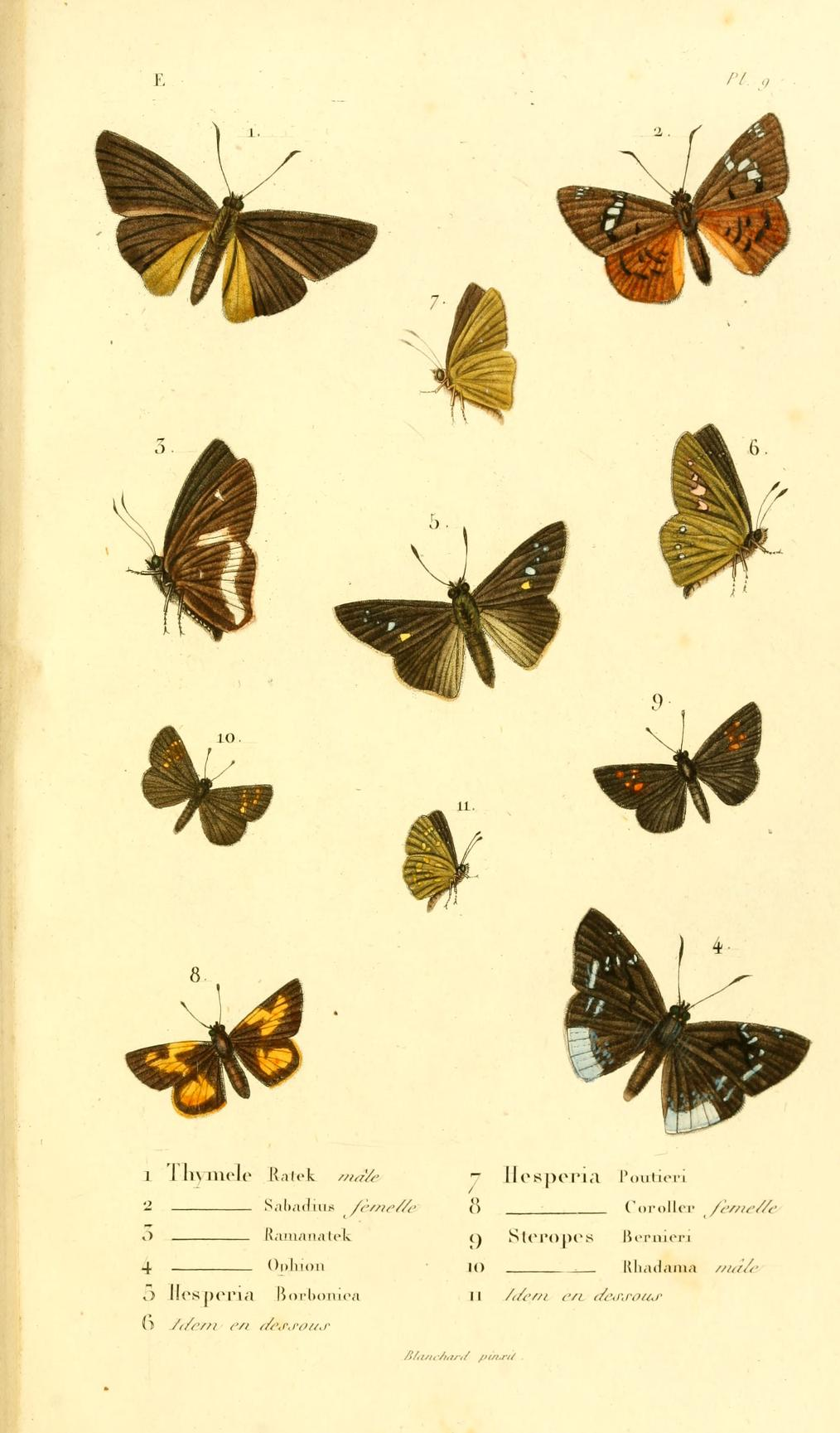

Scientific classification
- Kingdom: Animalia
- Phylum: Arthropoda
- Class: Insecta
- Order: Lepidoptera
- Family: Hesperiidae
- Genus: Fulda
- Species: F. rhadama

Binomial name
- Fulda rhadama (Boisduval, 1833)

Synonyms
- Steropes rhadama Boisduval, 1833

= Fulda rhadama =

Species of butterfly

Fulda rhadama is a species of butterfly in the family Hesperiidae. It is found in northern, central and eastern Madagascar. The habitat consists of forest margins and cleared forests.
