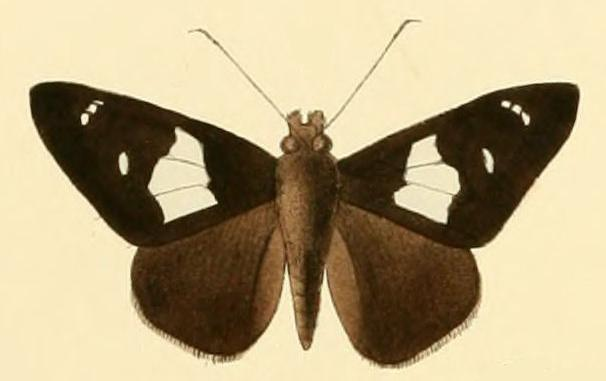

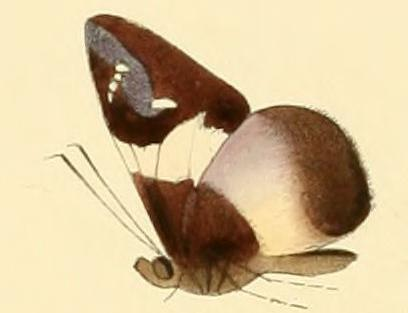

Scientific classification
- Kingdom: Animalia
- Phylum: Arthropoda
- Clade: Pancrustacea
- Class: Insecta
- Order: Lepidoptera
- Family: Hesperiidae
- Genus: Pteroteinon
- Species: P. caenira

Binomial name
- Pteroteinon caenira (Hewitson, 1867)

Synonyms
- Hesperia caenira Hewitson, 1867; Hesperia calpis Plötz, 1879

= Pteroteinon caenira =

Species of butterfly

Pteroteinon caenira, the white-banded red-eye, is a butterfly in the family Hesperiidae. It is found in Guinea, Sierra Leone, Liberia, Ivory Coast, Ghana, Nigeria, Cameroon, Gabon, the Republic of the Congo, the Central African Republic, the Democratic Republic of the Congo, Uganda and north-western Zambia. The habitat consists of forests and dense secondary growth.

Adults have been recorded mud-puddling.

The larvae feed on Phoenix dactylifera and Washingtonia filifera.

Torben Larsen developed a species numbering system for his 2005 publication Butterflies of West Africa. This species is #1391. The 'Larsen' numbers have since been used with permission in A Sharp Eye on Butterflies of Ghana.
