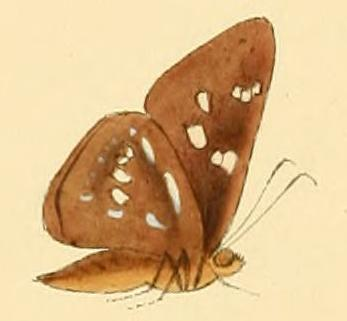

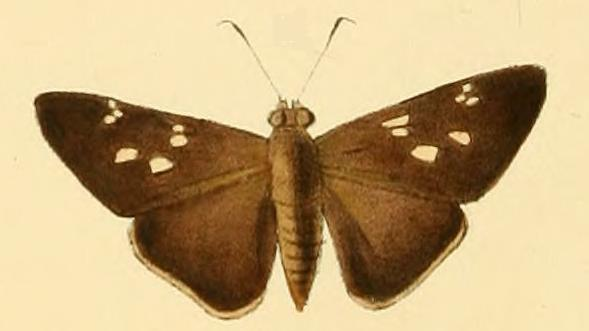

Scientific classification
- Kingdom: Animalia
- Phylum: Arthropoda
- Clade: Pancrustacea
- Class: Insecta
- Order: Lepidoptera
- Family: Hesperiidae
- Genus: Pithauria
- Species: P. marsena

Binomial name
- Pithauria marsena (Hewitson, [1866])

Synonyms
- Hesperia marsena Hewitson, [1866]; Hesperia ornata C. & R. Felder, [1867]; Hesperia subornata Plötz, 1883; Pithauriopsis aitchisoni Wood-Mason & de Nicéville, [1887]; Parnara uma de Nicéville, [1889]

= Pithauria marsena =

Species of butterfly

Pithauria marsena, the banded straw ace, is a butterfly in the family Hesperiidae. It is found from Sikkim to Burma and in Thailand, Laos, northern Vietnam, China, Malaysia, as well as on Borneo, Sumatra, Nias, Natuna, Java and Bali. Above it is blackish-brown, of the small white hyaline spots a double, rather large one is in the cell. Body and proximal portion of the wing dark, with hair of a somewhat greenish reflection. Under surface yellowish red-brown with a few small silvery yellow splashes scattered across the wing.
