= Fulda pauliani =

Scientific classification
- Kingdom: Animalia
- Phylum: Arthropoda
- Class: Insecta
- Order: Lepidoptera
- Family: Hesperiidae
- Genus: Fulda
- Species: F. pauliani

Binomial name
- Fulda pauliani Evans, 1952

Synonyms
- Fulda bernieri pauliani Evans, 1952

Species of butterfly

Fulda pauliani is a species of butterfly in the family Hesperiidae. It is found on Madagascar (the Sambirano district). The habitat consists of forest margins and cleared forests.
