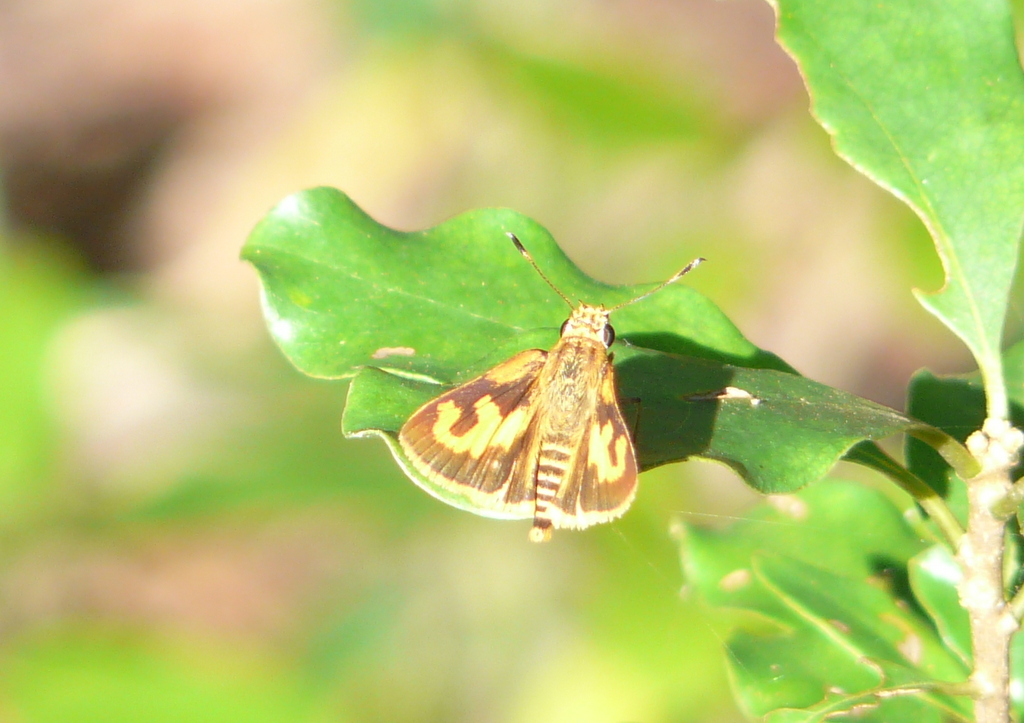

Scientific classification
- Domain: Eukaryota
- Kingdom: Animalia
- Phylum: Arthropoda
- Class: Insecta
- Order: Lepidoptera
- Family: Hesperiidae
- Genus: Acada
- Species: A. biseriata

Binomial name
- Acada biseriata (Mabille, 1893)

Synonyms
- Pamphila biseriata Mabille, 1893; Acada biseriatus; Pamphila zimbazo Trimen, 1894; Parosmodes icteria f. icteriana Strand, 1921

= Acada biseriata =

Species of butterfly

Acada biseriata, the axehead skipper or axehead orange, is a butterfly of the family Hesperiidae. It is found in Zimbabwe, from Mozambique to Kenya and in Zaire. It was recently discovered in the eastern part of the Soutpansberg in the Limpopo Province of South Africa.

The wingspan is 25–30 mm for males and 25–35 mm for females. Adults are on wing year-round (with a peak in late summer and autumn in Zimbabwe and Mozambique). In South Africa it has only been found in December.

The larvae feed on Brachystegia species, including Brachystegia spiciformis.
