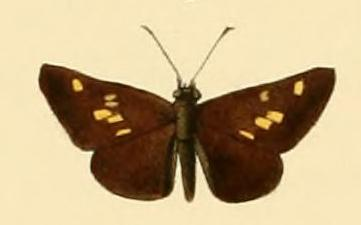
- Fulda bernieri

Scientific classification
- Kingdom: Animalia
- Phylum: Arthropoda
- Class: Insecta
- Order: Lepidoptera
- Family: Hesperiidae
- Tribe: Astictopterini
- Genus: Fulda; Evans, 1937

= Fulda (skipper) =

Genus of butterflies

Fulda is a genus of skippers in the family Hesperiidae. All species of this genus are known only from Madagascar.

== Species ==
- Fulda australis Viette, 1956
- Fulda bernieri (Boisduval, 1833)
- Fulda coroller (Boisduval, 1833)
- Fulda gatiana (Oberthür, 1923)
- Fulda imorina Evans, 1937
- Fulda lucida Evans, 1937
- Fulda pauliani Evans, 1952
- Fulda rhadama (Boisduval, 1833)
