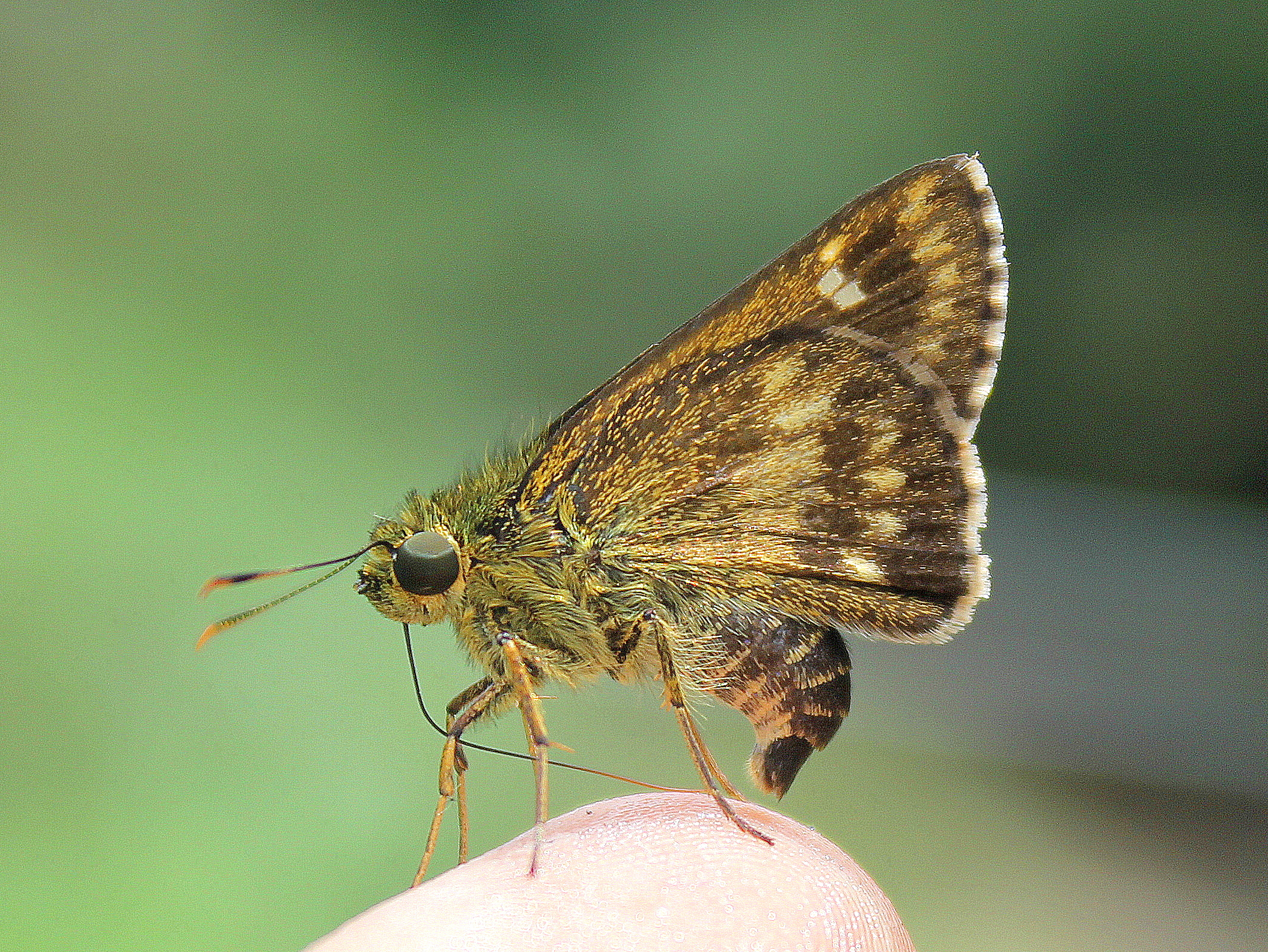

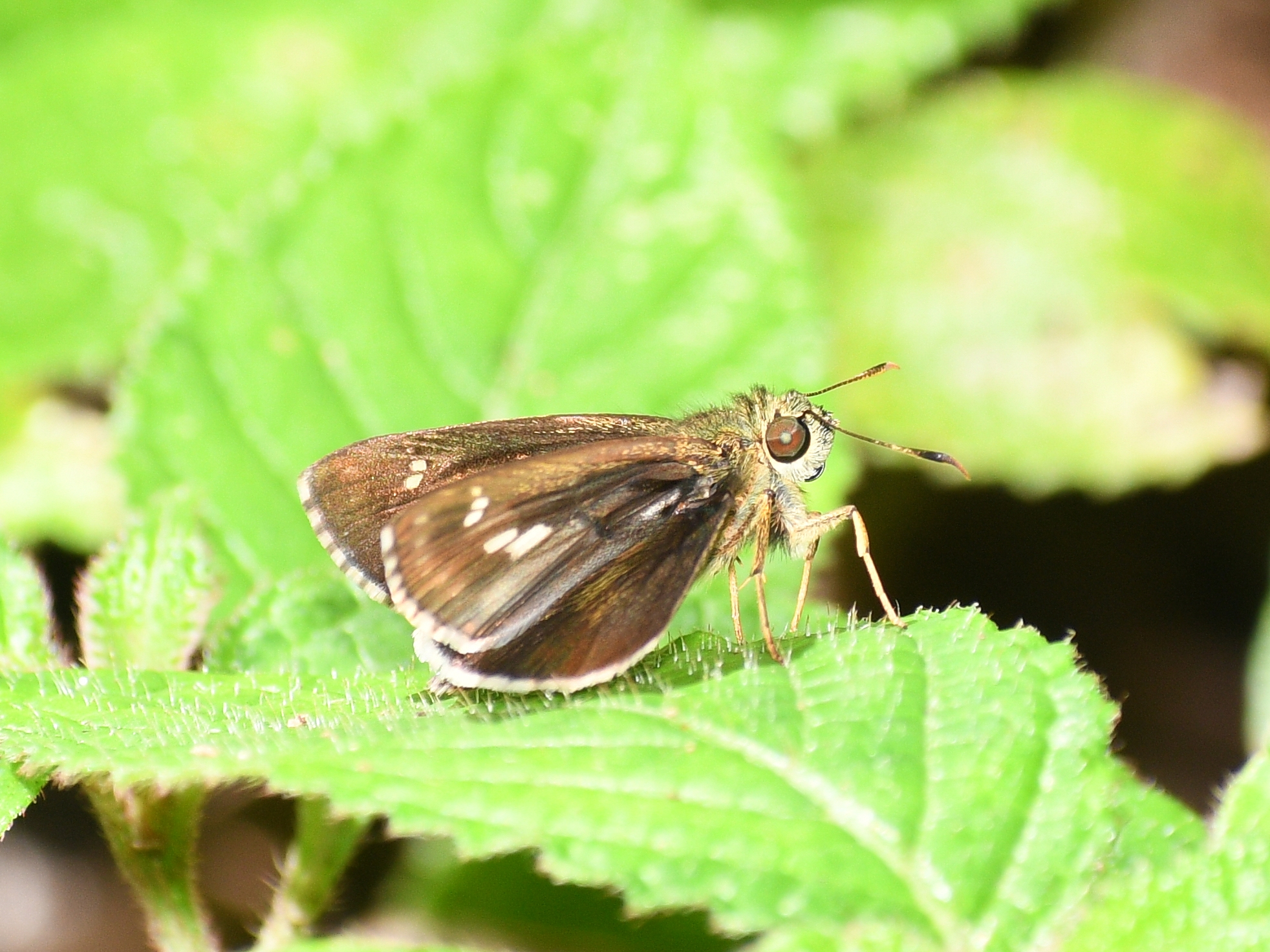

Scientific classification
- Kingdom: Animalia
- Phylum: Arthropoda
- Class: Insecta
- Order: Lepidoptera
- Family: Hesperiidae
- Genus: Halpe
- Species: H. filda

Binomial name
- Halpe filda Evans, 1949

Synonyms
- Halpe homolea filda Evans, 1949

= Halpe filda =

Species of butterfly

Halpe filda, also known as the absent ace or the Elwes' ace, is a butterfly in the family Hesperiidae. It is found in North-east India and Tibet. It was described by William Harry Evans in 1949. This species is monotypic.

== Description ==
This species is similar to Halpe molta, but the cell spot on the upperside forewing is absent or small. The central band on the underside hindwing is inconspicuous and diffused.
