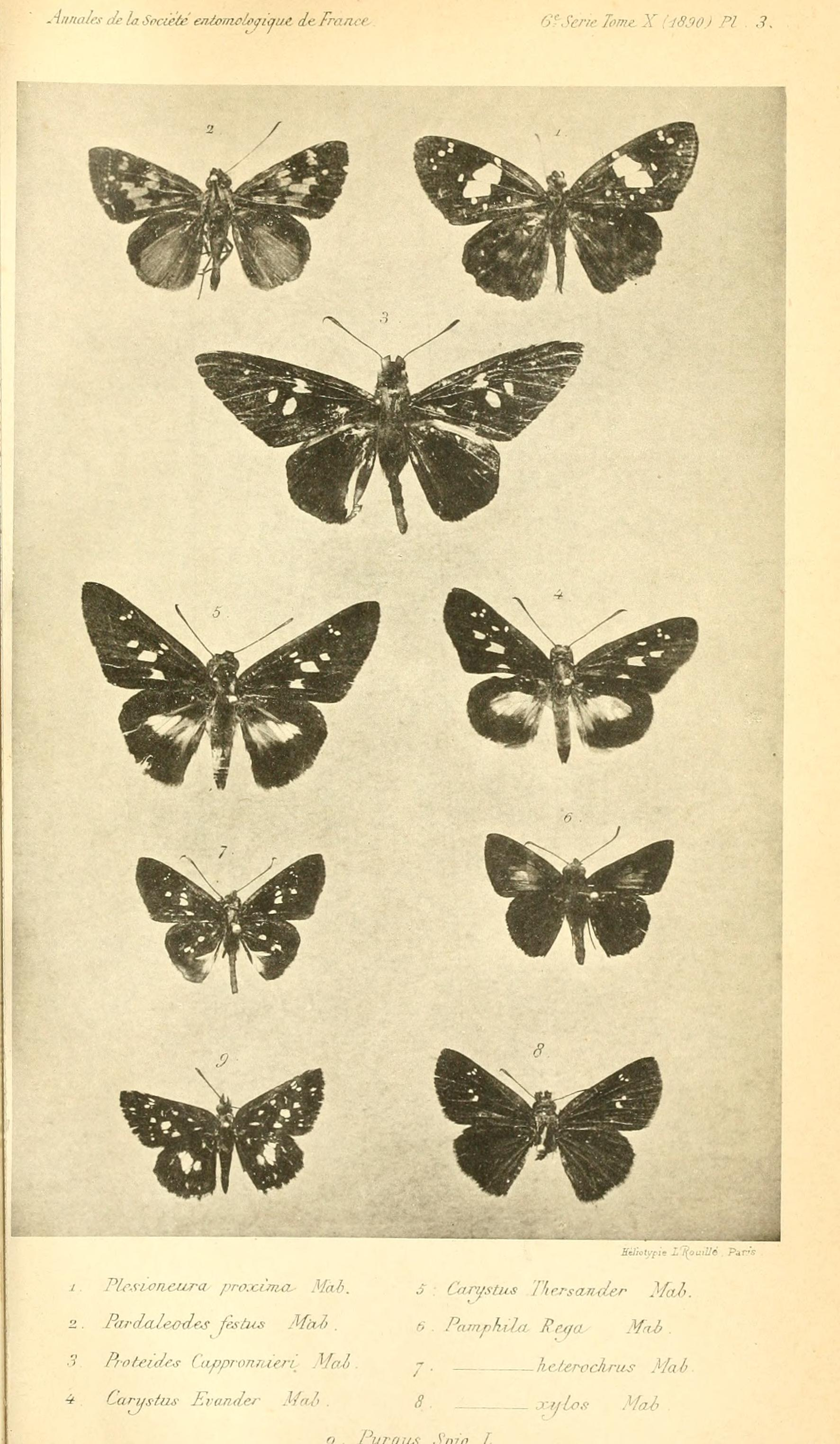

Scientific classification
- Kingdom: Animalia
- Phylum: Arthropoda
- Clade: Pancrustacea
- Class: Insecta
- Order: Lepidoptera
- Family: Hesperiidae
- Genus: Pteroteinon
- Species: P. capronnieri

Binomial name
- Pteroteinon capronnieri (Plötz, 1879)

Synonyms
- Hesperia capronnieri Plötz, 1879

= Pteroteinon capronnieri =

Species of butterfly

Pteroteinon capronnieri, or Capronnier's red-eye, is a butterfly in the family Hesperiidae. It is found in Ivory Coast, Ghana, Nigeria, Cameroon, the Republic of the Congo, the Central African Republic, the Democratic Republic of the Congo, western Uganda and north-western Tanzania. The habitat consists of deep forests.

Torben Larsen developed a species numbering system for his 2005 publication Butterflies of West Africa. This species is #1390. The 'Larsen' numbers have since been used with permission in A Sharp Eye on Butterflies of Ghana.
