= Fulda gatiana =

Scientific classification
- Kingdom: Animalia
- Phylum: Arthropoda
- Class: Insecta
- Order: Lepidoptera
- Family: Hesperiidae
- Genus: Fulda
- Species: F. gatiana

Binomial name
- Fulda gatiana (Oberthür, 1923)

Synonyms
- Cyclopides gatiana Oberthür, 1923

Species of butterfly

Fulda gatiana is a species of butterfly in the family Hesperiidae. It is found in northern Madagascar.
