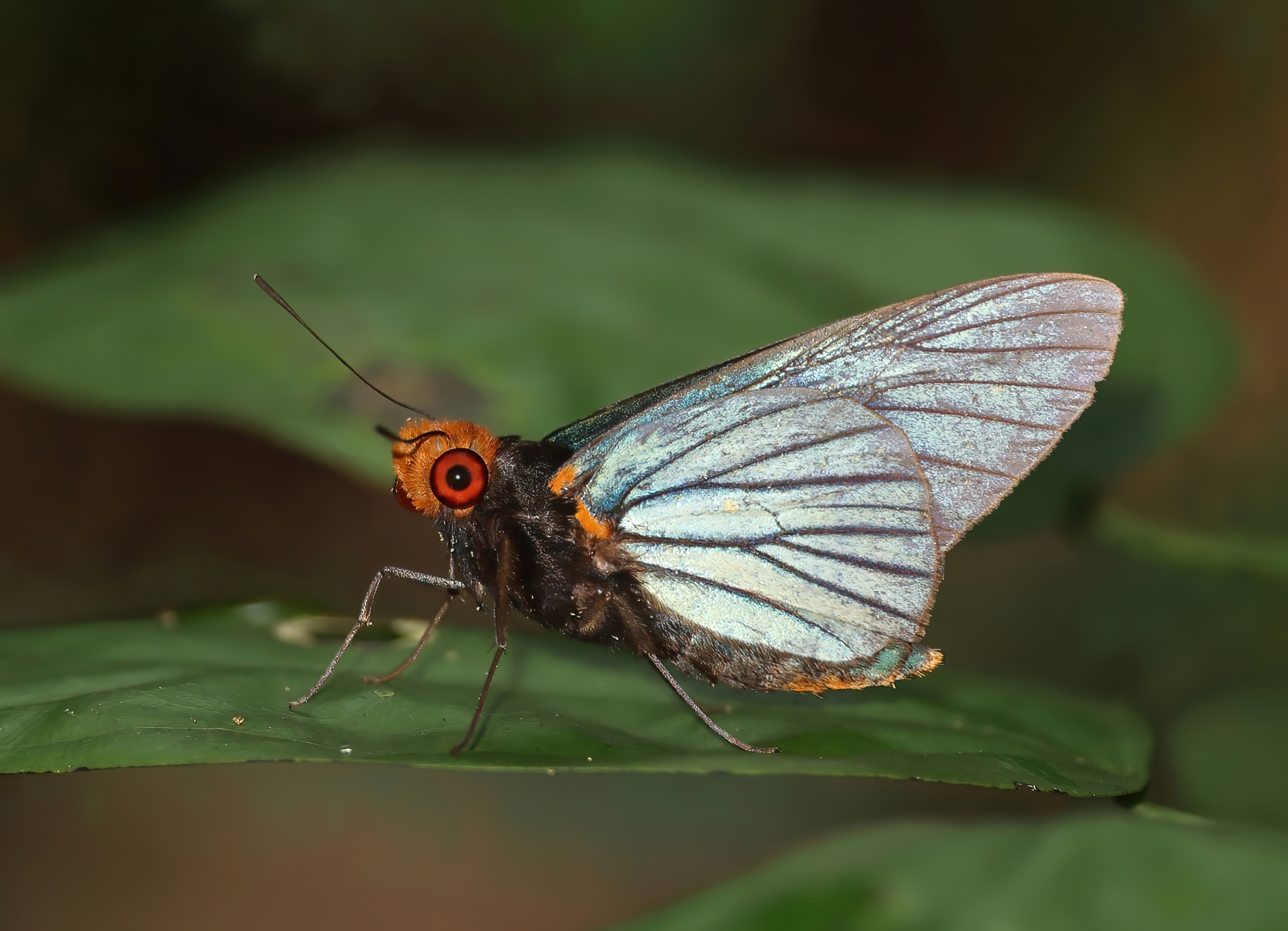
- Male in Ghana

Scientific classification
- Kingdom: Animalia
- Phylum: Arthropoda
- Clade: Pancrustacea
- Class: Insecta
- Order: Lepidoptera
- Family: Hesperiidae
- Genus: Pteroteinon
- Species: P. laufella

Binomial name
- Pteroteinon laufella (Hewitson, 1868)

Synonyms
- Hesperia laufella Hewitson, 1868

= Pteroteinon laufella =

Species of butterfly

Pteroteinon laufella, the blue red-eye, is a butterfly in the family Hesperiidae. It is found in north-eastern Guinea, Sierra Leone, Liberia, Ivory Coast, Ghana, Togo, Nigeria, Cameroon, Gabon, the Republic of the Congo, northern Angola and the central part of the Democratic Republic of the Congo. The habitat consists of forests.

Adults may spend the night inside the blossoms of Ipomoea species. Adult males occasionally mud-puddle.

The larvae feed on Elaeis guineensis and Cocos nucifera.

Torben Larsen developed a species numbering system for his 2005 publication Butterflies of West Africa. This species is #1387. The 'Larsen' numbers have since been used with permission in A Sharp Eye on Butterflies of Ghana.
