= Pteroteinon ceucaenira =

Scientific classification
- Domain: Eukaryota
- Kingdom: Animalia
- Phylum: Arthropoda
- Class: Insecta
- Order: Lepidoptera
- Family: Hesperiidae
- Genus: Pteroteinon
- Species: P. ceucaenira

Binomial name
- Pteroteinon ceucaenira (Druce, 1910)

Synonyms
- Caenides ceucaenira Druce, 1910

Species of butterfly

Pteroteinon ceucaenira, the pale white-banded red-eye, is a butterfly in the family Hesperiidae. It is found in Sierra Leone, Liberia, Ivory Coast, Ghana, Nigeria, Cameroon, the Republic of the Congo, the Democratic Republic of the Congo, Uganda and north-western Tanzania. The habitat consists of forests.
