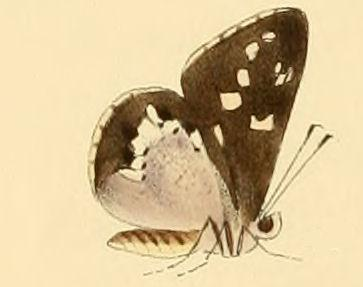
- Hypoleucis ophiusa

Scientific classification
- Kingdom: Animalia
- Phylum: Arthropoda
- Class: Insecta
- Order: Lepidoptera
- Family: Hesperiidae
- Tribe: Astictopterini
- Genus: Hypoleucis; Mabille, 1891

= Hypoleucis =

Genus of butterflies

Hypoleucis is a genus of skipper butterflies in the family Hesperiidae.

== Species ==
- Hypoleucis dacena (Hewitson, [1866]) – white-fringed recluse
- Hypoleucis ophiusa (Hewitson, [1866])
- Hypoleucis tripunctata Mabille, 1891

=== Former species ===
- Hypoleucis sophia Evans, 1937 - transferred to Caenides sophia (Evans, 1937)
