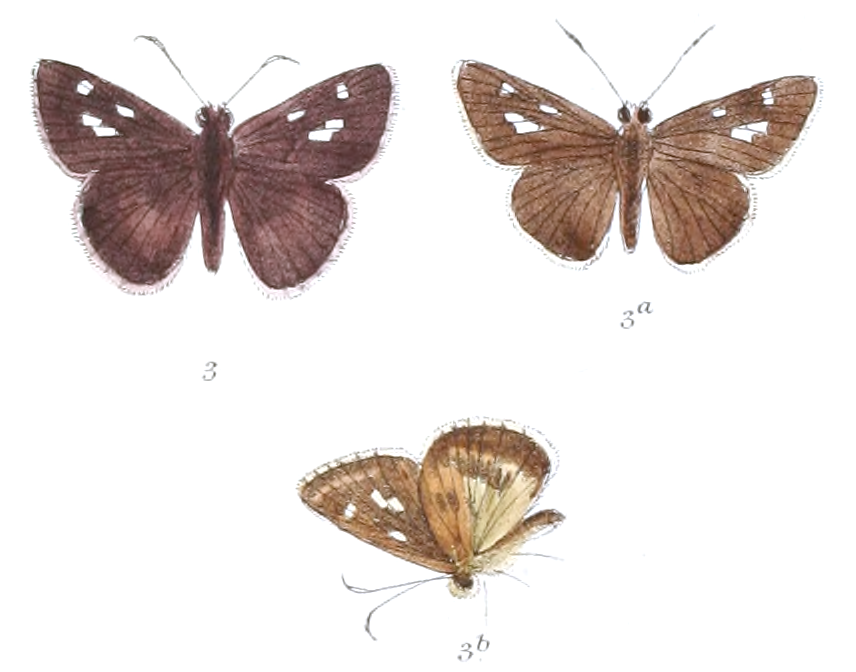
- Halpe homolea

Scientific classification
- Kingdom: Animalia
- Phylum: Arthropoda
- Class: Insecta
- Order: Lepidoptera
- Family: Hesperiidae
- Tribe: Astictopterini
- Genus: Halpe; Moore, 1878

Species
- Halpe homolea; Halpe honorei; Halpe porus

= Halpe =

Genus of butterflies

Halpe is a genus of grass skippers in the family Hesperiidae. It is found in the Indomalayan realm.

== Species ==
- Halpe albicilla de Jong & Treadaway, 1993 Sulawesi.
- Halpe arcuata Evans, 1937 Northeast India, Burma to Malay Peninsula, Laos, Yunnan
- Halpe aucma Swinhoe, 1893 Tibet
- Halpe aurifera (Elwes & Edwards, 1897) Burma, Thailand, Malaysia, Nias
- Halpe beturia (Hewitson, 1868) Sulawesi, Banggai
- Halpe burmana Swinhoe, 1893 Burma, Thailand, Laos
- Halpe clara Cassidy, 1985 Borneo
- Halpe damar Bedford-Russel, 1984 Sulawesi
- Halpe dante Evans, 1949
- Halpe dizangpusa Huang, 2002 China
- Halpe elana Eliot, 1939 Thailand, Laos, Malaya
- Halpe fasciata Elwes & Edwards, 1897
- Halpe filda Evans, 1949 Tibet, Sikkim
- Halpe flava Evans, 1926 Burma, Thailand, Laos, Malaya, Borneo
- Halpe frontieri Devyatkin, 1997 Vietnam
- Halpe gamma Evans, 1937 China, Formosa
- Halpe handa Evans, 1949 Burma, Thailand, Laos, Vietnam, Yunnan
- Halpe hauxwelli Evans, 1937 Burma, Thailand, Laos, Yunnan
- Halpe hermaphrodite Chiba & Tsukiyama, 1999 Philippines
- Halpe hieron de Nicéville, 1894 Sumatra
- Halpe homolea (Hewitson, 1868) Sikkim - Assam, Burma, Ceylon Malaya, Java
- Halpe inconspicua de Jong & Treadaway, 1993 Philippines
- Halpe insignis (Distant, 1886) Burma, Thailand, Malaysia, Singapore, Borneo, Sumatra
- Halpe knyvetti Elwes & Edwards, 1897 India, Tibet, Sikkim
- Halpe kumara de Nicéville, 1885 Sikkim, Assam, Yunnan
- Halpe kusala Frühstorfer, 1911 Burma, Thailand, Laos, Vietnam
- Halpe luteisquama (Mabille, 1877) Philippines
- Halpe luzona Evans, 1949 Philippines
- Halpe mixta Huang, 2003 Yunnan
- Halpe molta Evans, 1949 Tibet
- Halpe muoi Huang, 1999 Yunnan
- Halpe nephele Leech, 1893 Sichuan, Laos
- Halpe nuydai Murayama & Okumura, 1973
- Halpe ormenes (Plötz, 1886) Sikkim to Burma, Yunnan, Thailand, Laos, Malaya, Java
- Halpe palawea Staudinger, 1889
- Halpe parakumara Huang, 2003 China
- Halpe paupera Devyatkin, 2002 Vietnam, Hong Kong
- Halpe pelethronix Frühstorfer, 1910 Burma, Thailand, Malaya, Borneo, Sumatra, Java, Sundaland
- Halpe porus (Mabille, 1877) Nilgiris, Coorg, Kanara, Bihar, Mussoorie to Burma, West China, Hong Kong, Thailand, Laos, Vietnam, Malaya, Hainan, Langkawi
- Halpe purpurascens de Jong & Treadaway, 1993 Philippines
- Halpe scissa Cantlie, 1961 Assam
- Halpe sikkima Moore, 1882 Sikkim to Burma, Thailand, Laos, Hainan, Malaya, Borneo, Sumatra, Java
- Halpe sulphurifera (Herrich-Schäffer, 1869)
- Halpe tilia Evans, 1949 Philippines
- Halpe toxopea Evans, 1932 Thailand, Langkawi, Malaya, Borneo, Sumatra, Java, Bali, Palawan
- Halpe veluvana Frühstorfer, 1911 Java
- Halpe wantona Swinhoe, 1893 Assam to Burma, Thailand, Laos, Malaya
- Halpe zandra Evans, 1937
- Halpe zema (Hewitson, 1877) Sikkim to Burma, Thailand, Laos, Yunnan, Malaya, Java
- Halpe zinda Evans, 1937 Malaya
- Halpe zola Evans, 1937 Burma, Thailand, Laos

== Biology ==
Halpe larvae feed on Gramineae including Dinochloa, Ochlandra talbotii and Bambusa
