= Eogenes =

Scientific classification
- Kingdom: Animalia
- Phylum: Arthropoda
- Class: Insecta
- Order: Lepidoptera
- Family: Hesperiidae
- Subfamily: Hesperiinae
- Tribe: Astictopterini
- Genus: Eogenes; Mabille, 1909

Genus of butterflies

Eogenes is a Palearctic genus of grass skippers in the family Hesperiidae.

== Species ==
The following species are recognised in the genus Eogenes:

- Eogenes alcides
- Eogenes lesliei (Evans, 1910) the Pakistani skipper (Chitral)
