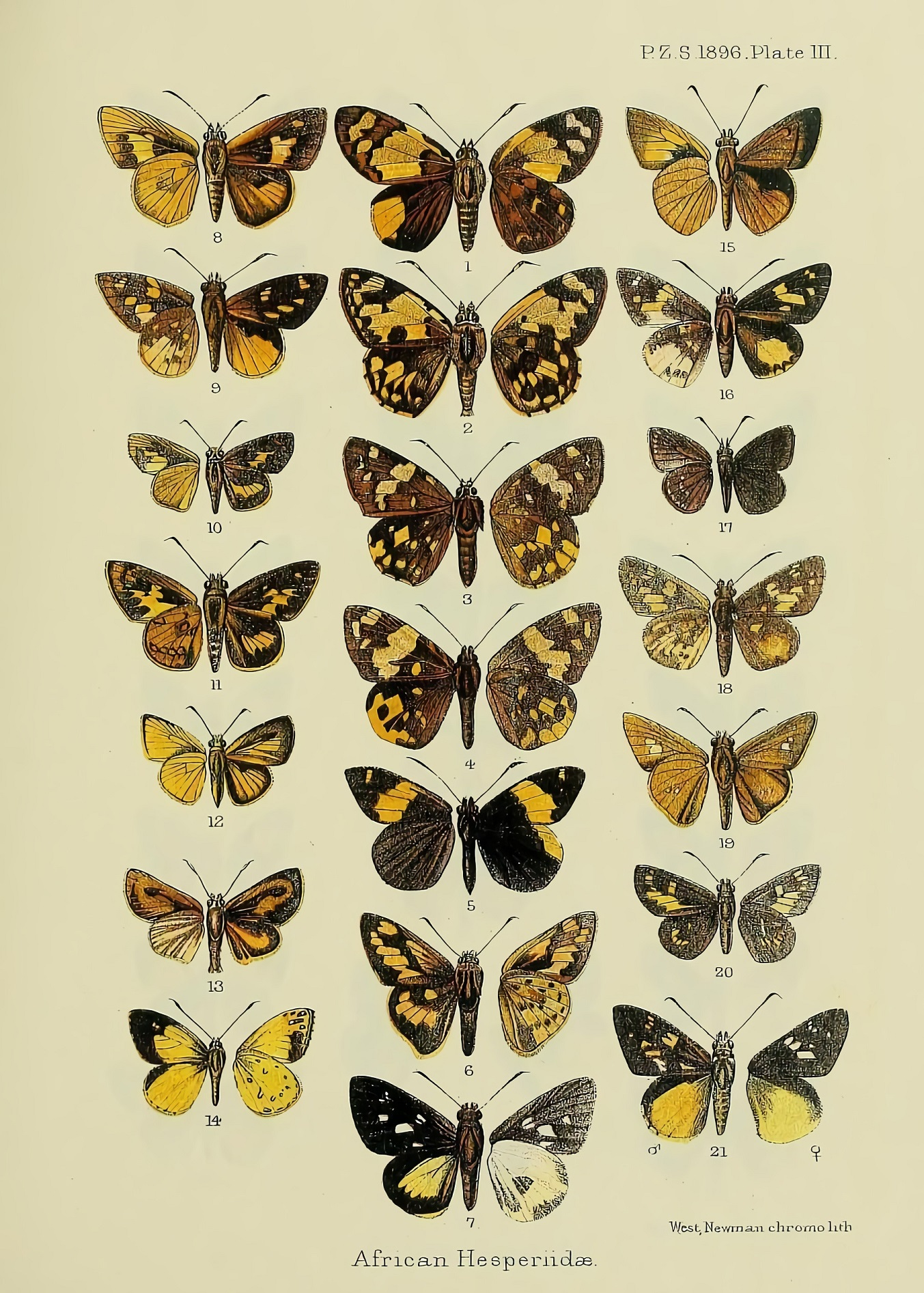
- Figure 11

Scientific classification
- Domain: Eukaryota
- Kingdom: Animalia
- Phylum: Arthropoda
- Class: Insecta
- Order: Lepidoptera
- Family: Hesperiidae
- Genus: Acada
- Species: A. annulifer

Binomial name
- Acada annulifer (Holland, 1892)

Synonyms
- Oxypalpus annulifer Holland, 1892

= Acada annulifer =

Dark axehead skipper

Species of butterfly

Acada annulifer, the dark axehead skipper, is a butterfly in the family Hesperiidae. It is found in Nigeria, Cameroon, Gabon and the Democratic Republic of the Congo. The habitat consists of forests.
