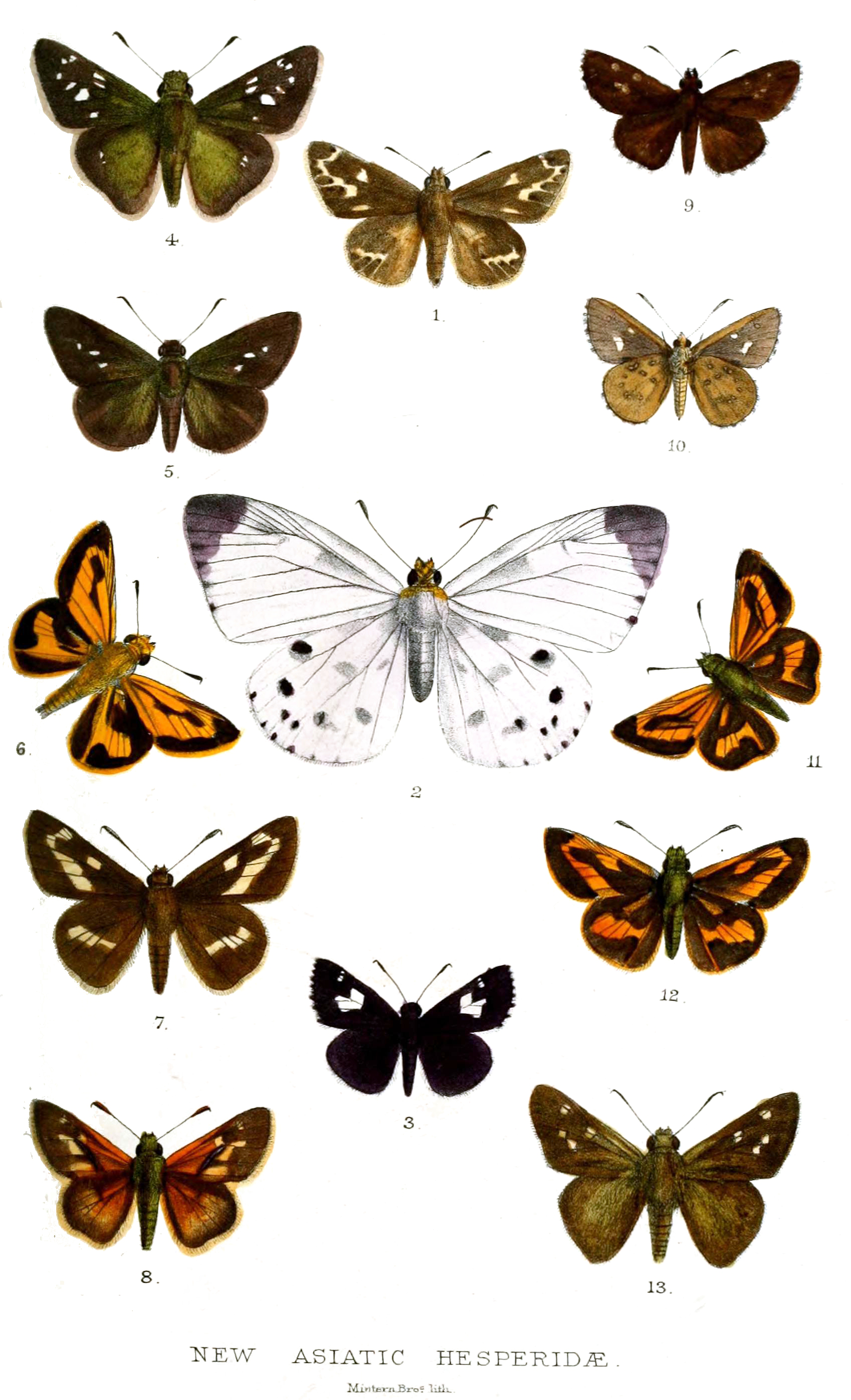
- Pithauria murdava figure 13

Scientific classification
- Domain: Eukaryota
- Kingdom: Animalia
- Phylum: Arthropoda
- Class: Insecta
- Order: Lepidoptera
- Family: Hesperiidae
- Genus: Pithauria
- Species: P. murdava

Binomial name
- Pithauria murdava Moore, 1866

Synonyms
- Ismene murdava Moore, 1866; Hesperia weymeri Protz, 1883

= Pithauria murdava =

Species of butterfly

Pithauria murdava is a skipper butterfly in the family Hesperiidae first described by Frederic Moore in 1866. It is found in Darjeeling, India.

== Description ==
Upperside olive brown: forewing with the base grey, with six small yellow spots, two within the extremity of the cell, two near the costa, one-third from the apex, and two midway beneath; hindwing grey to beyond the middle. Underside pale yellowish brown; disk of forewing blackish, spots as above: hindwing with indistinct submarginal and discal pale yellowish spots. Abdomen above with greyish-brown segmental bands. Palpi, abdomen, and legs beneath dull yellow.
