= Acada =

Scientific classification
- Kingdom: Animalia
- Phylum: Arthropoda
- Class: Insecta
- Order: Lepidoptera
- Family: Hesperiidae
- Tribe: Ceratrichiini
- Genus: Acada; Evans, 1937

Genus of skipper butterflies in tribe Erionotini

Acada is an Afrotropical genus of skippers.

== Species ==
- Acada annulifer (Holland, 1892)
- Acada biseriata (Mabille, 1893)
