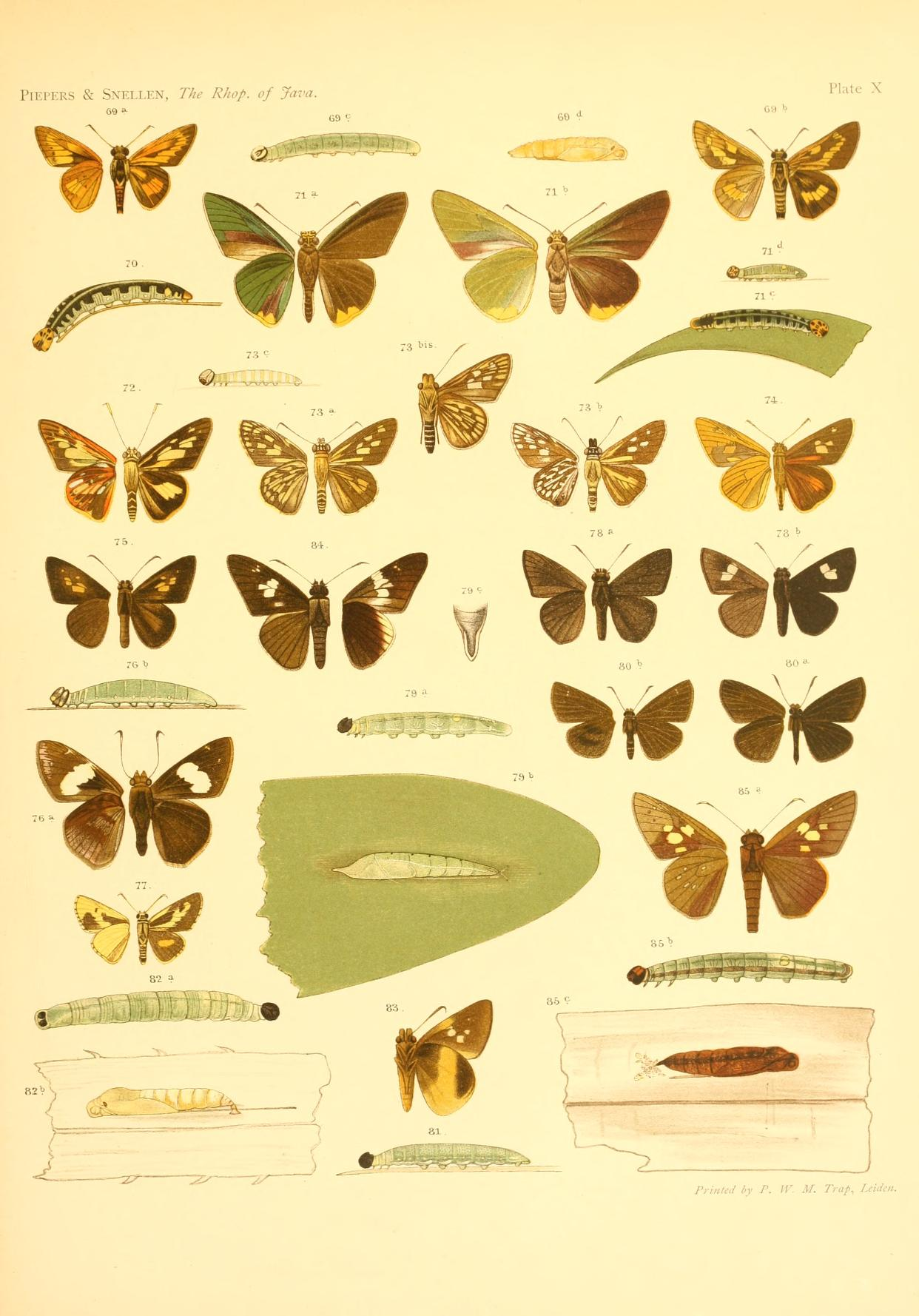
- A. jama olivascens in Rhopalocera of Java (figure 80)

Scientific classification
- Kingdom: Animalia
- Phylum: Arthropoda
- Class: Insecta
- Order: Lepidoptera
- Family: Hesperiidae
- Tribe: Astictopterini
- Genus: Astictopterus; C. & R. Felder, 1860

Synonyms
- Psolos Semper, 1892; [?]Psolos Watson, 1893

= Astictopterus =

Genus of butterflies

Astictopterus is a genus of grass skippers in the family Hesperiidae. The type species is from Southeast Asia. Previously the genus contained two species groups, one from the Indomalayan which at core remains, whilst the second from the Afrotropical region are more recently placed in the genus Dotta or Isoteinon.

== Species ==
The genus is now potentially monophyletic containing:

- Astictopterus jama C. & R. Felder, 1860 – forest hopper – Southeast Asia

However, several subspecies of Astictopterus jama have been described, some of which may be treated as distinct species in future studies.

=== Former species ===
- Astictopterus abjecta (Snellen, 1872) - transferred to Isoteinon abjecta (Snellen, 1872)
- Astictopterus anomoeus (Plötz, 1879) - transferred to Isoteinon anomoeus (Plötz, 1879)
- Astictopterus armatus Druce, 1873 - transferred to Kerana armatus (Druce, 1873)
- Astictopterus bruno (Evans, 1937) - transferred to restored Isoteinon anomoeus Evans, 1937
- Astictopterus butleri de Nicéville, [1884] - transferred to Koruthaialos butleri (de Nicéville, [1884])
- Astictopterus inornatus (Trimen, 1864) - transferred to Isoteinon inornatus (Trimen, 1864)
- Astictopterus ozias Hewitson, 1878 - transferred to Oz ozias (Hewitson, 1878)
- Astictopterus punctulata (Butler, 1895) - transferred to Isoteinon punctulata (Butler, 1895)
- Astictopterus stellata (Mabille, 1891) – transferred to Dotta stellata (Mabille, 1891)
- Astictopterus tura Evans, 1951 - transferred to Dotta tura (Evans, 1951)

For African taxa see e.g. after Woodhall 2005

== Biology ==
The larvae feed on Gramineae, Marantaceae, Acanthaceae including Miscanthus sinensis, Phrynium spicatum, Asystasia
