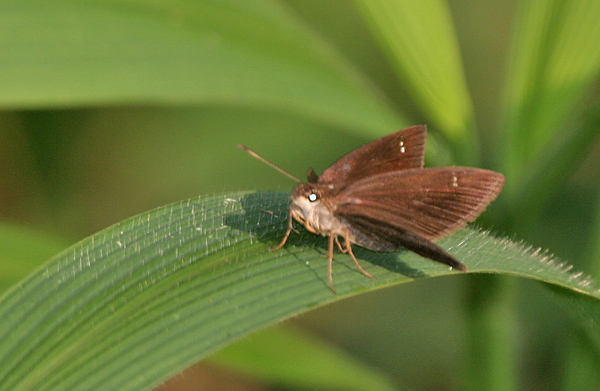

Scientific classification
- Kingdom: Animalia
- Phylum: Arthropoda
- Class: Insecta
- Order: Lepidoptera
- Family: Hesperiidae
- Genus: Astictopterus
- Species: A. jama

Binomial name
- Astictopterus jama C. & R. Felder, 1860

Synonyms
- List: Tagiades pulligo Mabille, 1876; Isoteinon melania Plötz, 1885; Cyclopides chinensis Leech, 1890; Astictopterus olivascens Moore, 1878; Cyclopides henrici Holland, 1887; Astictopterus kada Swinhoe, 1893; Astictopterus olivascens permagnus Fruhstorfer, 1910; Astictopterus henrici tonkinianus Fruhstorfer, 1910; Astictopterus quadripunctatus Swinhoe, 1915

= Astictopterus jama =

Species of butterfly

Astictopterus jama, the forest hopper or coon, is a species of butterfly in the family Hesperiidae. It is found in Southeast Asia.

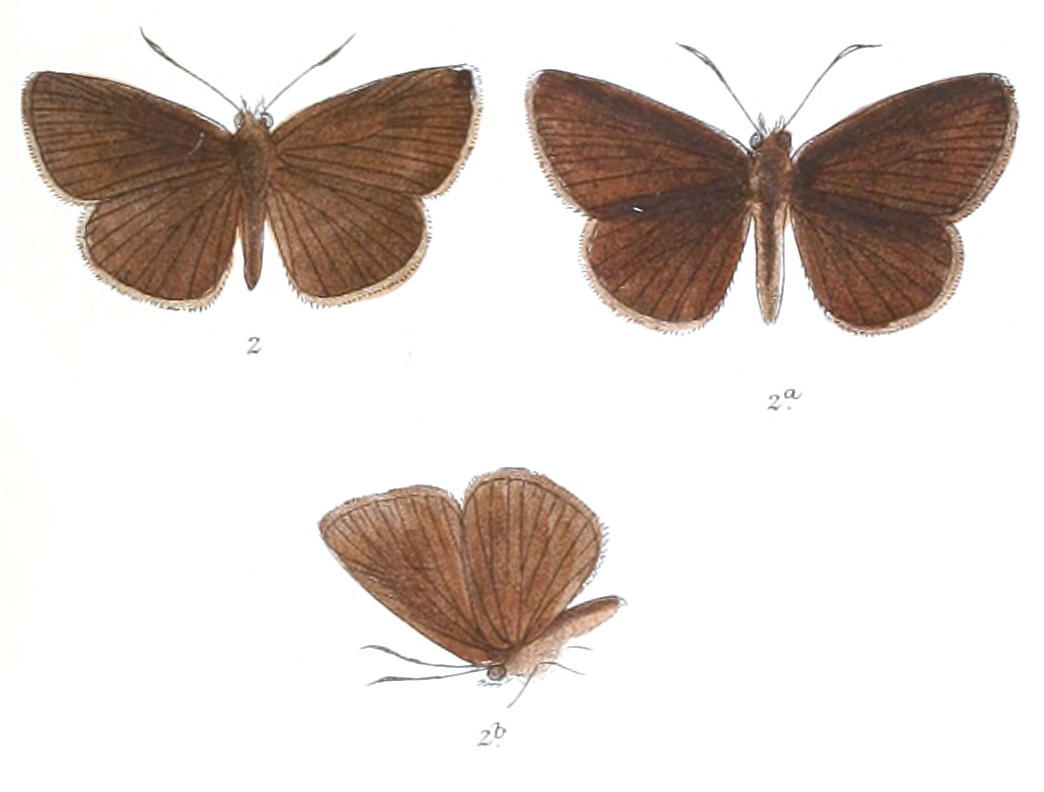
Astictopterus jama olivascens

The larvae feed on Miscanthus sinensis.

== Subspecies ==
- Astictopterus jama jama (Thailand, Langkawi, Malaysia, Tioman, Aur, Singapore, Sumatra, Java)
- Astictopterus jama chinensis (Leech, 1890) (China)
- Astictopterus jama olivascens Moore, 1878 (Sikkim to Burma, Andamans, Thailand, Laos, Vietnam, Hainan, southern China, Yunnan)
