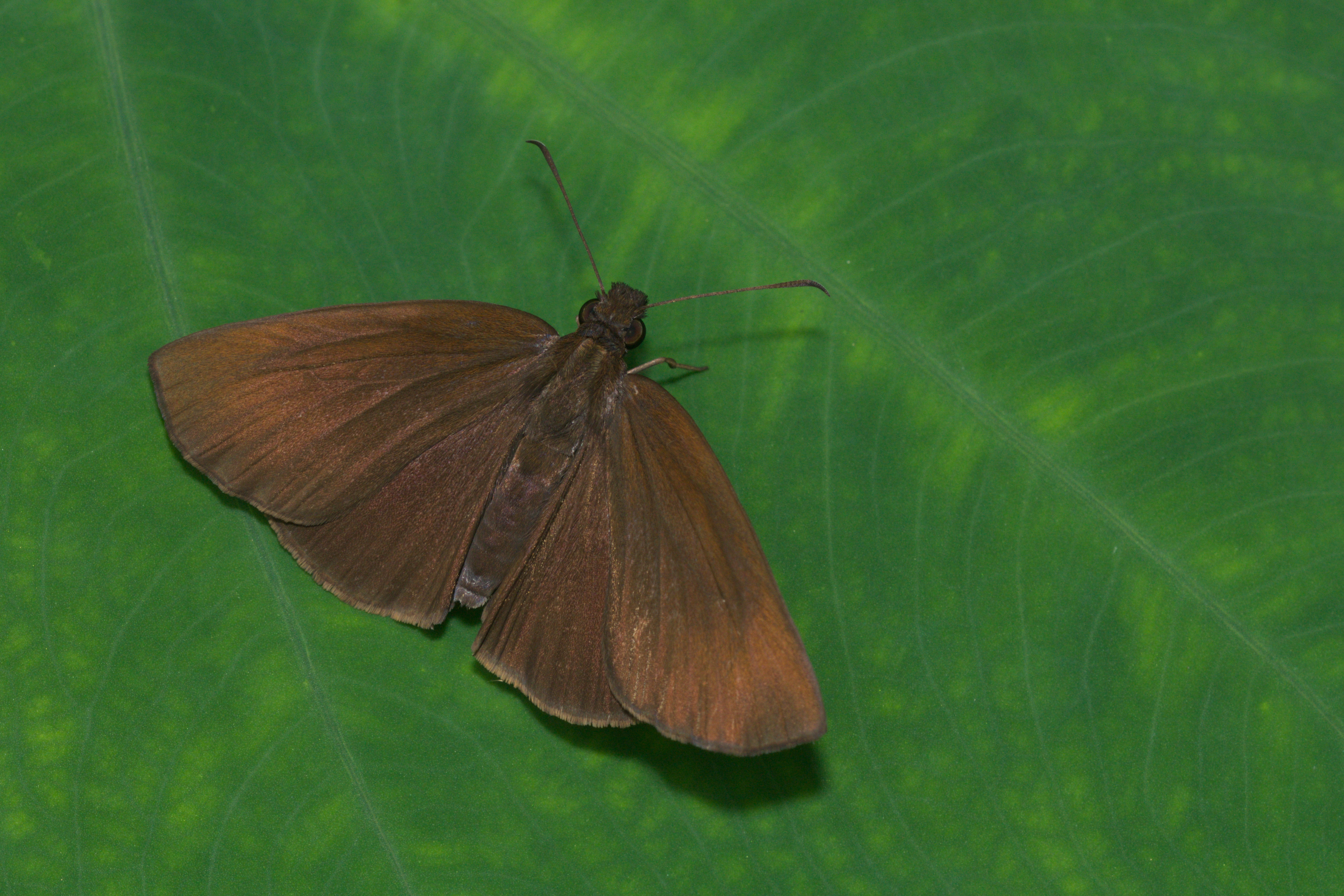
- At Kadavoor, Kerala, India

Scientific classification
- Kingdom: Animalia
- Phylum: Arthropoda
- Class: Insecta
- Order: Lepidoptera
- Family: Hesperiidae
- Genus: Psolos
- Species: P. fuligo

Binomial name
- Psolos fuligo (Mabille, 1876)

Synonyms
- Tagiades fuligo Mabille, 1876 Sancus fuligo (Mabille, 1876) Antigonus kethra Plötz, 1884 Antigonus forensis Plötz, 1884 Astictopterus ulunda Staudinger, 1889

= Psolos fuligo =

Species of butterfly

Psolos fuligo, the dusky partwing or coon, is a species of butterfly belonging to the family Hesperiidae. It is found in India. The tips of the forewings diverge outward and is a feature that is clear when they rest on vegetation.

== Description ==
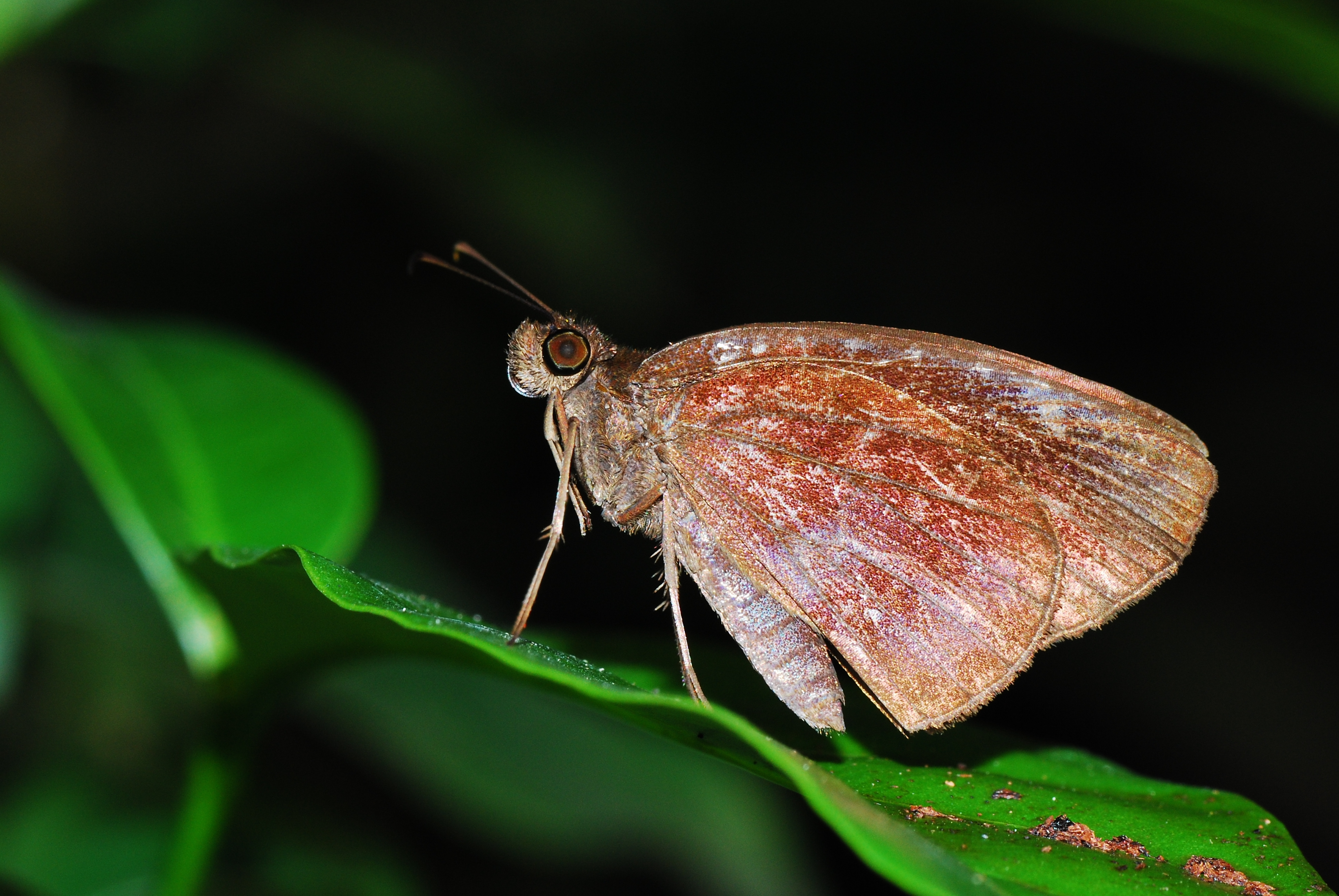
Side view

It is a small butterfly with a wingspan of 36 to 46 millimetres (1.4 to 1.8 in). Both sexes look alike, excepting that the male has a prominent brand on the under forewing. It is a plain brown butterfly on the upperside. Underneath, the butterfly is similarly coloured but paler. There are diffused greyish-purple markings on the tip of the under forewing and a series of pale spots in spaces 4 to 9. Similarly spots can be seen on the under hindwing in spaces 2 to 7 and at the end cell.

== Distribution and status ==
The butterfly ranges from India to Southeast Asia and the Indonesian archipelago.

India forms the western boundary of the coon with the butterfly found in the Western Ghats in peninsular India, and from Assam to Arunachal Pradesh, other states of the north-east India and into Bangladesh and southern Myanmar. In south-east Asia, the coon flies in Thailand, Malaysia, Singapore, Vietnam, Laos, Philippines, and possibly southern China. In the Indonesian archipelago, the coon flies in Borneo, Java, Sumatra, Sipora, Bali, Palawan, Sulawesi and Banggai.

The butterfly is common in India.

== Subspecies ==
There are three subspecies:

- P. f. fuligo - found in Thailand, peninsular Malaysia and archipelagos of Indonesia and Philippines
- P. f. subfasciatus (Moore, [1879]) - found in India, Myanmar, Indo-China
- P. f. fuscula (Snellen, 1878) - Sulawesi, Banggai

== Natural history ==
The butterfly is a weak flier which prefers to stay low and frequent shady nooks or grassy patches in forested areas. Often seen perched on leaves. The characteristic identification of this butterfly is that the tips of the forewings remain spread apart even when the wings are closed.

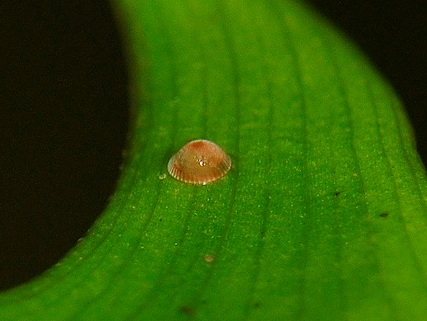
Egg

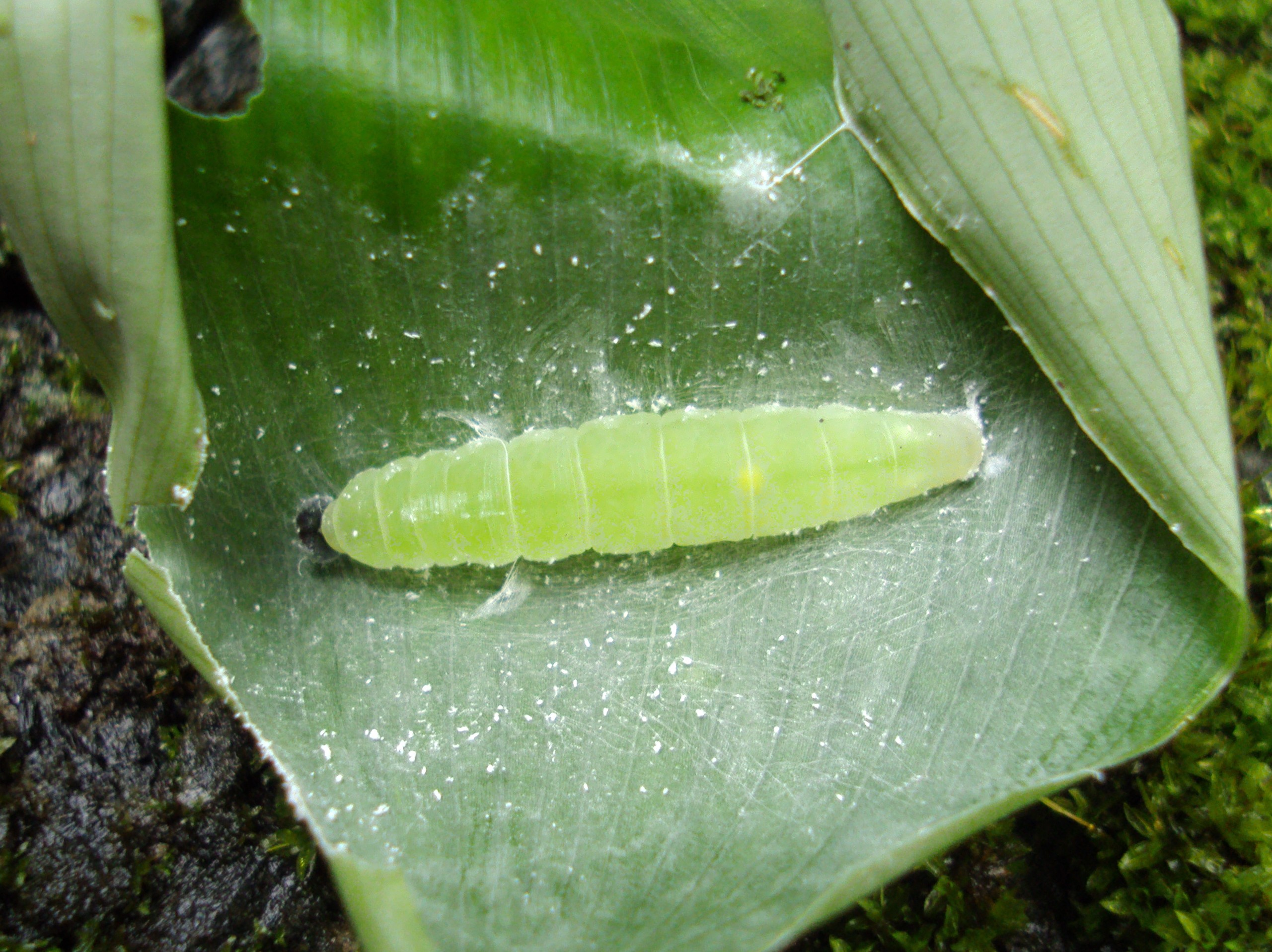
Larva

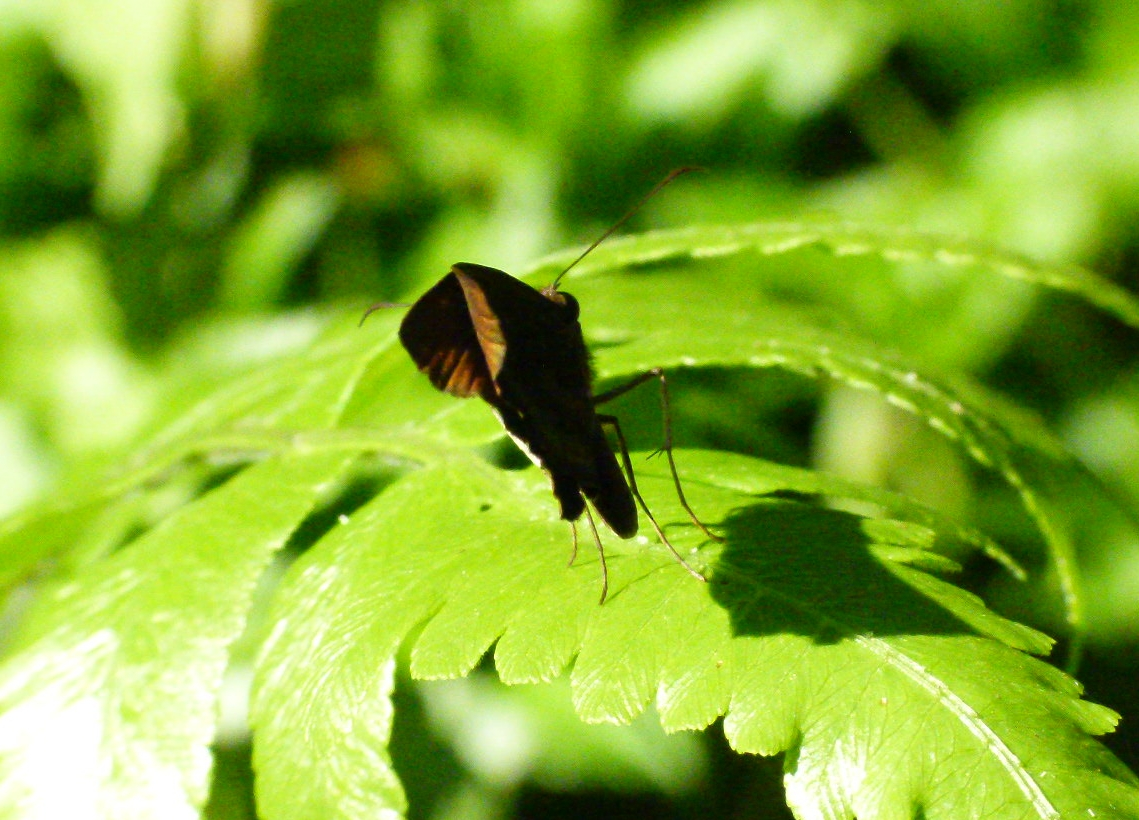
Showing the tips of the forewings bent outwards

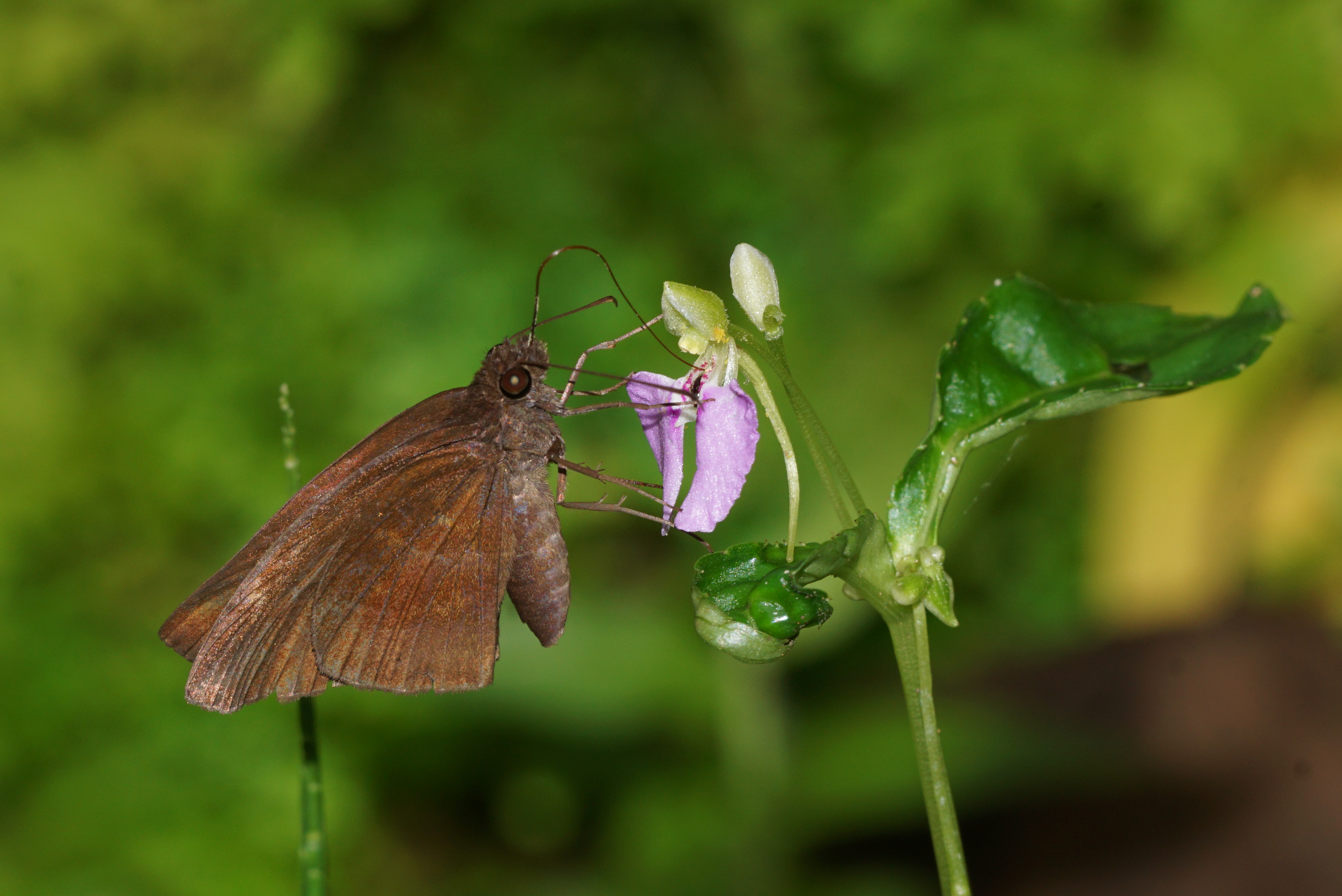
On flower

The recorded food plants of the larvae are all from the family Marantaceae:

- Maranta arundinacea
- Schumannianthus virgatus
- Stachyphrynium spicatum
- Donax species

The subfamily Aroidaea (family Araceae) has also been recorded as a food plant in west Malaysia.
