= Dotta =

Dotta may refer to:

- Dotta (butterfly), a genus of butterflies in the tribe Astictopterini
- Giulia Dotta, an Italian dancer and choreographer
