= Herbaspirillum autotrophicum =

Scientific classification
- Domain: Bacteria
- Kingdom: Pseudomonadati
- Phylum: Pseudomonadota
- Class: Betaproteobacteria
- Order: Burkholderiales
- Family: Oxalobacteraceae
- Genus: Herbaspirillum
- Species: H. autotrophicum

Binomial name
- Herbaspirillum autotrophicum (Aragno and Schlegel 1978) Ding & Yokata (2004)

Synonyms
- Aquaspirillum autotrophicum

Species of bacterium

Herbaspirillum autotrophicum is a bacterium which cannot fix nitrogen under laboratory conditions, like Herbaspirillum seropedicae, because it does not have the Nif gene.
