= Nitrogen fixation package =

A nitrogen fixation package is a piece of research equipment for studying nitrogen fixation in plants. One product of this kind, the Q-Box NF1LP made by Qubit Systems, operates by measuring the hydrogen (H_{2}) given off in the nitrogen-fixing chemical reaction enabled by nitrogenase enzymes.

== Principle of operation ==
Nitrogen is produced by bacteria, which have an endo-symbiotic relationship with the legume host. In this relationship, the plant shares its carbohydrates with the bacteria so that the bacteria can thrive, and the plant benefits by having excess nitrogen made available. The bacteria's creation of nitrogen also creates hydrogen, which is what the unit measures to determine the nitrogen produced. Measurement of H_{2} evolution as a means of determining nitrogenase activity is an alternative technique to acetylene reduction assay, and allows real-time monitoring of changes in nitrogenase activity.

== Product description ==
Q-Box NF1LP is an experimental package using an open-flow gas exchange system for measurement of nitrogen fixation in H_{2}-producing legume symbioses. A flow-through H_{2} sensor (Q-S121) measures the production rate of H_{2} from N_{2}-fixing tissues, allowing in vivo measurement of nitrogenase activity in real time. Measurements of nitrogenase activity on up to three plants is possible, i.e. a four-channel system including a reference sample.

== Operation ==
Nitrogen fixation packages must be used in a laboratory-type environment. This can be a temporary laboratory set up in the field, as long as it is under stable, uncontaminated conditions. The product must be supplied with many potted samples of the plants and of the neighbouring soil, taken from separate areas on the farm or field under study. The tests rely on the availability of the Herbaspirillum bacteria in the soil. This bacterium is found at the root of most legumes, which is where they produce nitrogen. To test soil properly, it must be free of added nitrogen fertilizers, which have harmful effects on the Herbaspirillum bacteria needed for fixation.

== Applications ==
Different aspects of nitrogen fixation can be examined with these products, such as effects of temperature on the fixation process, the regulation of the process by oxygen, and the inhibition of nitrogen fixation by an over-abundance of fertilizers.
