= Herbaspirillum huttiense =

Scientific classification
- Domain: Bacteria
- Kingdom: Pseudomonadati
- Phylum: Pseudomonadota
- Class: Betaproteobacteria
- Order: Burkholderiales
- Family: Oxalobacteraceae
- Genus: Herbaspirillum
- Species: H. huttiense

Binomial name
- Herbaspirillum huttiense (Leifson 1962); Ding and Yokota 2004

Type strain
- ATCC 14670 CIP 103296; DSM 10281; IAM 14941; JCM 21423; LMG 2199

Synonyms
- Pseudomonas huttiensis Leifson 1962; Herbaspirillum putei

Species of bacterium

Herbaspirillum huttiense is a Gram-negative species of bacteria.
