= Herbaspirillum chlorophenolicum =

Scientific classification
- Domain: Bacteria
- Kingdom: Pseudomonadati
- Phylum: Pseudomonadota
- Class: Betaproteobacteria
- Order: Burkholderiales
- Family: Oxalobacteraceae
- Genus: Herbaspirillum
- Species: H. chlorophenolicum

Binomial name
- Herbaspirillum chlorophenolicum Im et al., 2004

Type strain
- CCUG 52898, CIP 108432, CPW301, DSM 17796, IAM 15024, JCM 21487, KCTC 12096, Lee CPW301, LMG 22686

Synonyms
- Herbaspirillum chlorophenicus

Species of bacterium

Herbaspirillum chlorophenolicum is a 4-chlorophenol-degrading bacterium from the genus Herbaspirillum.
