= Isoteinon bruno =

Scientific classification
- Kingdom: Animalia
- Phylum: Arthropoda
- Class: Insecta
- Order: Lepidoptera
- Family: Hesperiidae
- Genus: Isoteinon
- Species: I. bruno

Binomial name
- Isoteinon bruno Evans, 1937

Synonyms
- Astictopterus bruno (Evans, 1937)

Species of butterfly

Isoteinon bruno or the brown sylph is a species of butterfly in the family Hesperiidae. In some works it is listed under Astictopterus bruno (Evans, 1937). It is found in Tanzania (south-west to the Marungu highlands and the Lindi River).
