= Herbaspirillum hiltneri =

Scientific classification
- Domain: Bacteria
- Kingdom: Pseudomonadati
- Phylum: Pseudomonadota
- Class: Betaproteobacteria
- Order: Burkholderiales
- Family: Oxalobacteraceae
- Genus: Herbaspirillum
- Species: H. hiltneri

Binomial name
- Herbaspirillum hiltneri Rothballer et al. 2006

Type strain
- CCUG 54573, CIP 109904, DSM 17495, LMG 23131, N3, Rothballer N3

Species of bacterium

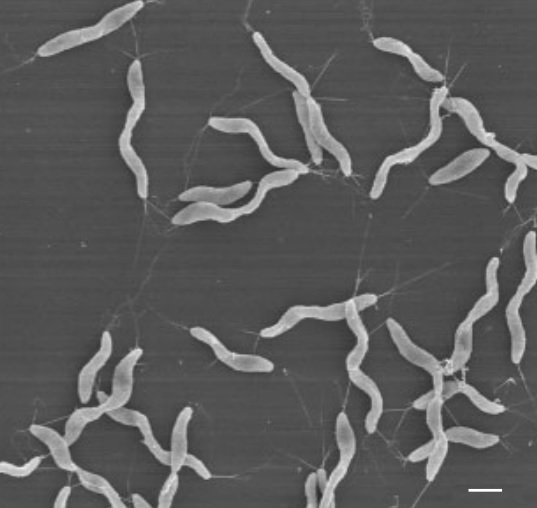
Herbaspirillum hiltneri

Herbaspirillum hiltneri is a Gram-negative bacterium of the genus Herbaspirillum isolated from surface-sterilized wheat roots. It was collected in the Oberpfalz in Germany.
