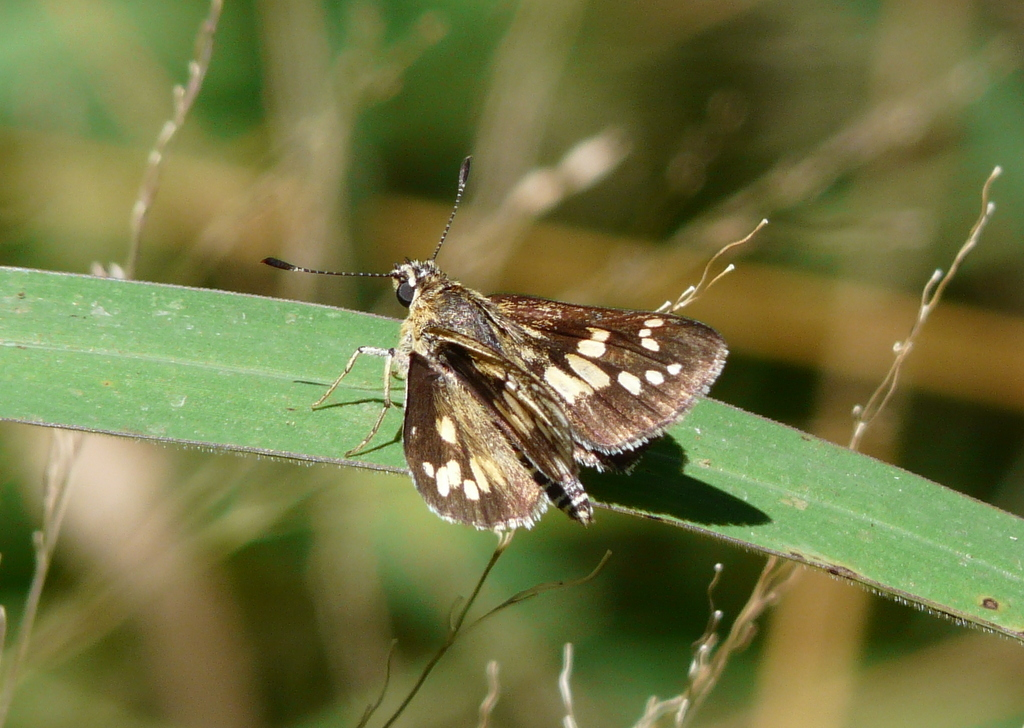

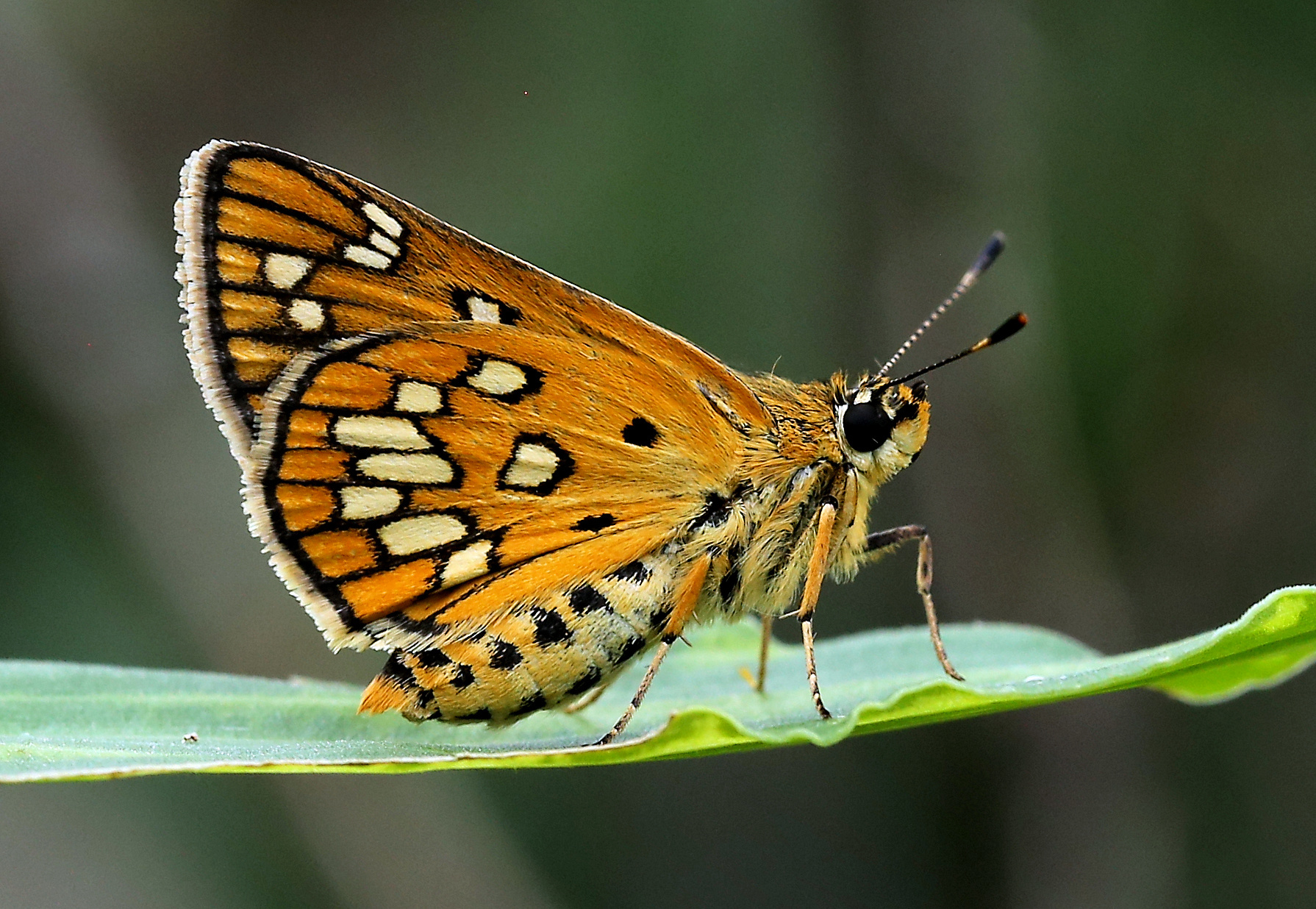

Conservation status
- Least Concern (IUCN 3.1)

Scientific classification
- Kingdom: Animalia
- Phylum: Arthropoda
- Class: Insecta
- Order: Lepidoptera
- Family: Hesperiidae
- Genus: Dotta
- Species: D. callicles

Binomial name
- Dotta callicles (Hewitson, 1868)

Synonyms
- Cyclopides callicles Hewitson, 1868; Hesperia aleta Plötz, 1883; Kedestes callicles (Hewitson, 1868)

= Dotta callicles =

Pale ranger

Species of butterfly

Dotta callicles, the pale ranger, is a species of butterfly in the family Hesperiidae. It is found in South Africa (KwaZulu-Natal, Transvaal), Eswatini, Mozambique and Zimbabwe.

The wingspan is 27–29 mm for males and 31–33 mm for females. Adults are on wing from November to April (with a peak from February to March). There is one extended generation per year.

The larvae feed on Imperata cylindrica.
