= Herbaspirillum aquaticum =

Scientific classification
- Domain: Bacteria
- Kingdom: Pseudomonadati
- Phylum: Pseudomonadota
- Class: Betaproteobacteria
- Order: Burkholderiales
- Family: Oxalobacteraceae
- Genus: Herbaspirillum
- Species: H. aquaticum

Binomial name
- Herbaspirillum aquaticum Dobritsa et al. 2010

Type strain
- ATCC BAA-1628, DSM 21191, IEH 4430

Species of bacterium

Herbaspirillum aquaticum is a bacterium of the genus Herbaspirillum.
