= Herbaspirillum rubrisubalbicans =

Scientific classification
- Domain: Bacteria
- Kingdom: Pseudomonadati
- Phylum: Pseudomonadota
- Class: Betaproteobacteria
- Order: Burkholderiales
- Family: Oxalobacteraceae
- Genus: Herbaspirillum
- Species: H. rubrisubalbicans

Binomial name
- Herbaspirillum rubrisubalbicans (Christopher and Edgerton 1930) Baldani et al. 1996

Type strain
- 5A, ATCC 19308, B 579, BCRC 15833, CCRC 15833, CCUG 17392, CCUG 17679, CFBP 1202, CIP 105019, DSM 11543, DSM 9440, Hayward 5A, Hayward B579, IAM 14976, ICMP 5777, JCM 21447, KCTC 12138, LMG 2286, NBRC 102523, NCPPB 1027, NZRCC 10271, PDDCC 5777

Synonyms
- Phytomonas rubrisubalbicans, Herbispirillum rubrisubalbicans, Pseudomonas rubrisubalbicans

Species of bacterium

Herbaspirillum rubrisubalbicans is a nitrogen-fixing bacterium of the genus Herbaspirillum found in roots and stems of sugarcane (Saccharum officinarum), sorghum (Sorghum bicolor), and rice (Oryza sativa). H. rubrisubalbicans can cause symptoms of the mottled stripe disease in sugarcane and sorghum. Leaves inoculated with H. rubrisubalbicans show red stripes along the secondary veins of the leaf blade.
