= Herbaspirillum frisingense =

Scientific classification
- Domain: Bacteria
- Kingdom: Pseudomonadati
- Phylum: Pseudomonadota
- Class: Betaproteobacteria
- Order: Burkholderiales
- Family: Oxalobacteraceae
- Genus: Herbaspirillum
- Species: H. frisingense

Binomial name
- Herbaspirillum frisingense Kirchhof et al. 2001

Type strain
- CCUG 47444, DSM 13128, GSF 30, Hartman GSF30, IAM 14974, JCM 21445, KCTC 12900 LMG 21446, LMG 23164, NBRC 102522

Species of bacterium

Herbaspirillum frisingense is a nitrogen-fixing bacterium which was found as an endophyte in C4-fibre plants like prairie cordgrass (Spartina pectinata), Chinese silver grass, (Miscanthus sinensis), Amur silver-grass (Miscanthus sacchariflorus), and Napier grass (Pennisetum purpureum). The specific name frisingense comes from Freising, a town in Germany where H. frisingense was first isolated from prairie cordgrass and Miscanthus plants.

== Interaction with Chinese silver grass ==
In an experiment investigating the interaction between Miscanthus sinensis and Herbaspirillum frisingense, a roughly 20% increase in fresh biomass was observed in M. sinensis following inoculation with H. frisingense. This experiment showed a unique mechanism. Inoculation saw an upregulation in the genes relevant to jasmonate and ethylene production in the plant roots, although the mechanism to this is still unknown. Specifically, H. frisingense was shown to upregulate ethylene receptors and repress ethylene response factors, overall leading to an increase in root growth. Additionally, H. frisingense is known to produce indoleacetic acid (IAA), and was also shown to manage IAA genes, indicating that there is an intricate balance maintained between ethylene and IAA by H. frisingense.
