= Herbaspirillum rhizosphaerae =

Scientific classification
- Domain: Bacteria
- Kingdom: Pseudomonadati
- Phylum: Pseudomonadota
- Class: Betaproteobacteria
- Order: Burkholderiales
- Family: Oxalobacteraceae
- Genus: Herbaspirillum
- Species: H. rhizosphaerae

Binomial name
- Herbaspirillum rhizosphaerae Jung et al., 2007

Type strain
- CIP 108917, KCTC 12558, LMG 24413, UMS-37

Species of bacterium

Herbaspirillum rhizosphaerae is a Gram-negative mesophilic bacterium of the genus Herbaspirillum isolated from rhizosphere soil of Allium victorialis var. platyphyllum on Ulleung Island in Korea.
