= Herbaspirillum lusitanum =

Scientific classification
- Domain: Bacteria
- Kingdom: Pseudomonadati
- Phylum: Pseudomonadota
- Class: Betaproteobacteria
- Order: Burkholderiales
- Family: Oxalobacteraceae
- Genus: Herbaspirillum
- Species: H. lusitanum

Binomial name
- Herbaspirillum lusitanum Valverde et al. 2003

Type strain
- CCUG 48869 CECT 5661; CIP 108242; DSM 17154; LMG 21710; P6-12 strain P6-12; Valverde P6-12

Species of bacterium

Herbaspirillum lusitanum is a nitrogen-fixing bacterium found in root nodules of common beans (Phaseolus vulgaris). Phylogenetic analyses have shown this bacterium belongs to the genus Herbaspirillum. H. lusitanum lacks the nif gene. A nodD-like gene is present, but no other nod genes have been identified. The lack of nif and nod genes suggests H. lusitanum is an opportunistic bacterium capable of colonizing root nodules, but is unable to fix nitrogen.
