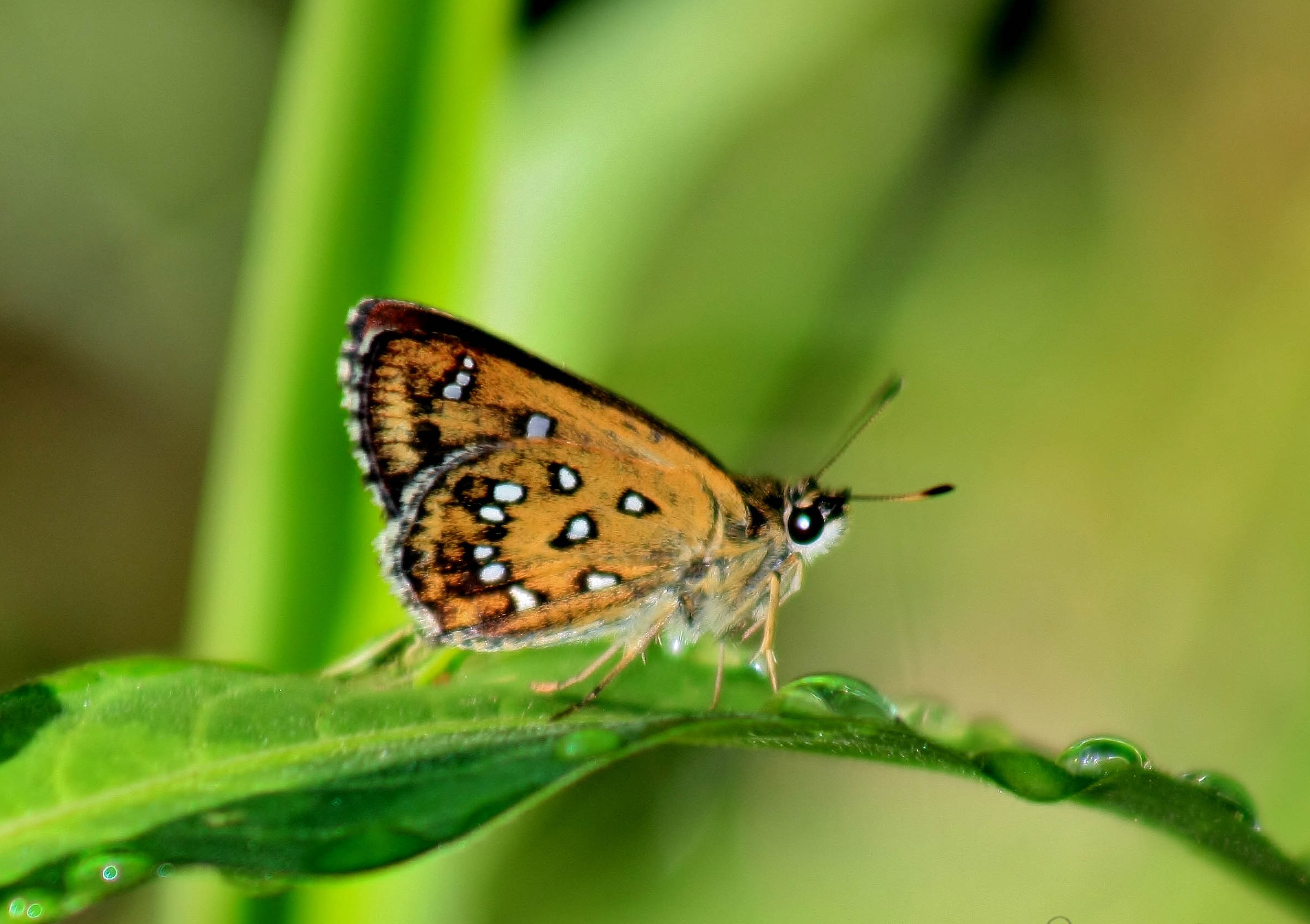
- Nominate subspecies

Scientific classification
- Kingdom: Animalia
- Phylum: Arthropoda
- Class: Insecta
- Order: Lepidoptera
- Family: Hesperiidae
- Genus: Isoteinon
- Species: I. lamprospilus

Binomial name
- Isoteinon lamprospilus C. & R. Felder, 1862

= Isoteinon lamprospilus =

Genus of butterflies

Isoteinon lamprospilus is a species of skipper butterfly in the family Hesperiidae. It is found in China and Japan.
