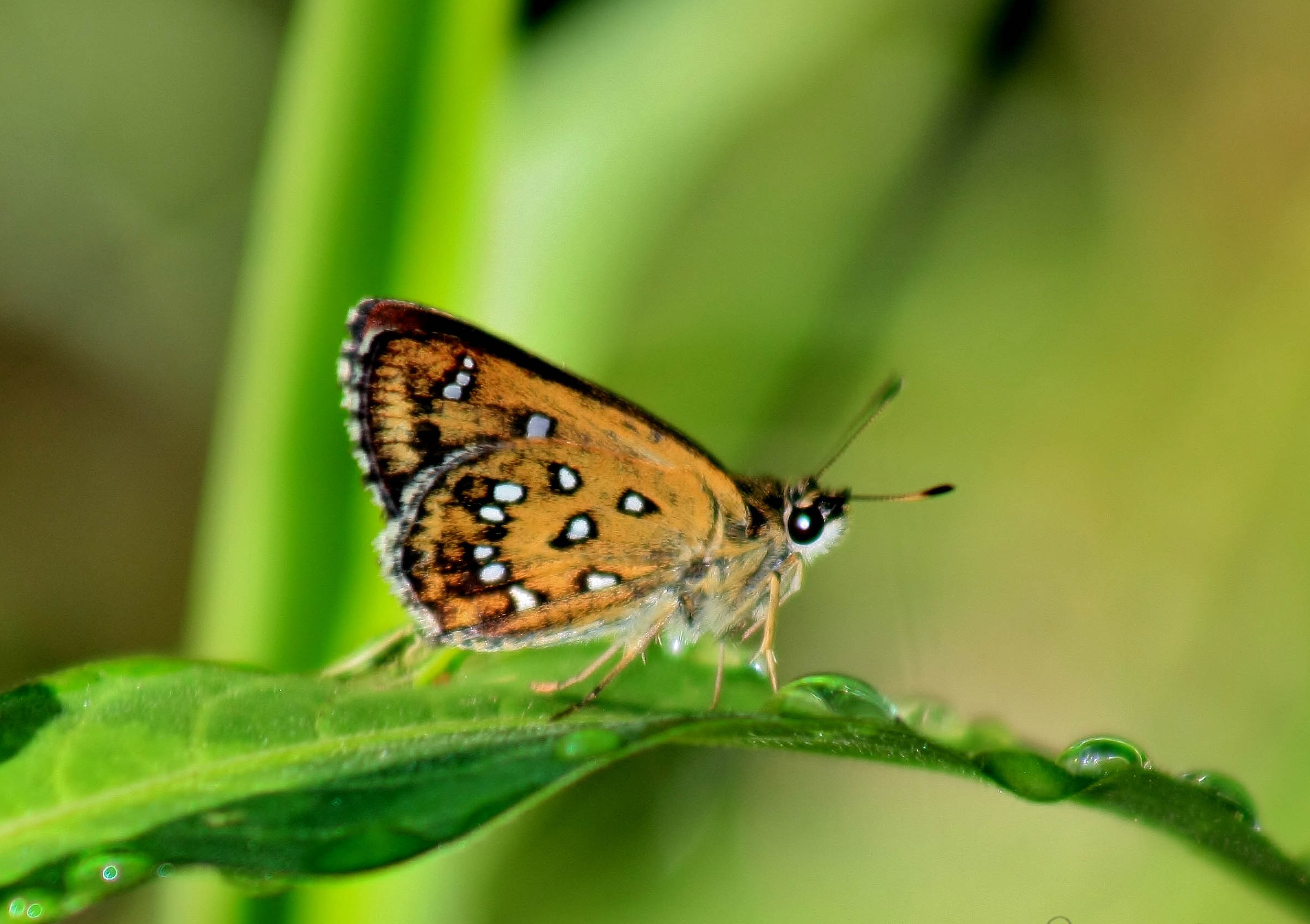
- Isoteinon lamprospilus
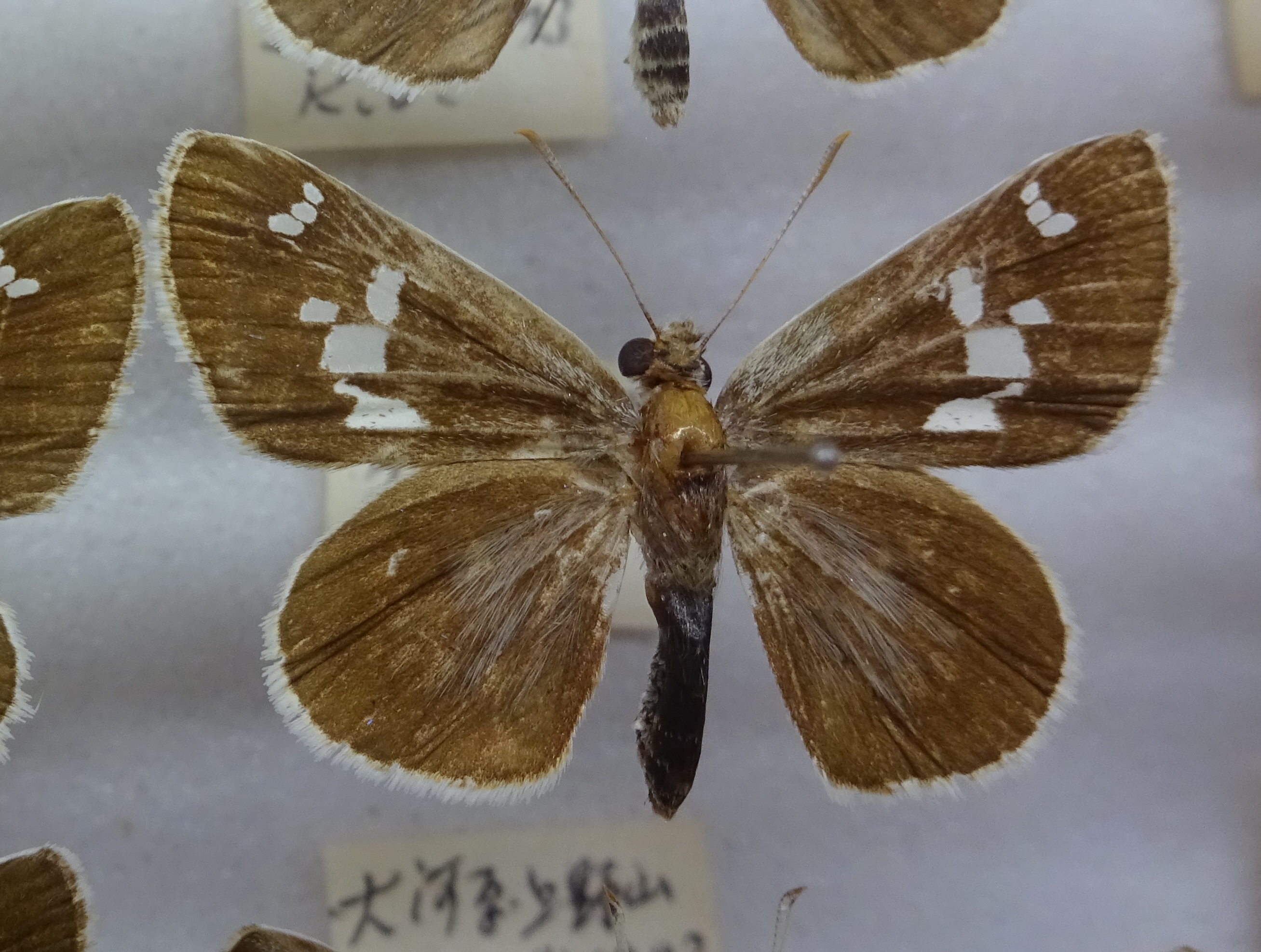

Scientific classification
- Kingdom: Animalia
- Phylum: Arthropoda
- Class: Insecta
- Order: Lepidoptera
- Family: Hesperiidae
- Tribe: Astictopterini
- Genus: Isoteinon; C. & R. Felder, 1862

= Isoteinon =

Genus of butterflies

Isoteinon is a genus of skipper butterflies in the family Hesperiidae. The type species is Isoteinon lamprospilus from eastern Asia. However, recent studies based largely on genomic data have supported inclusion of several African species.

== Species ==
The following species are recognised in the genus Isoteinon:

- Isoteinon abjecta (Snellen, 1872) – abject hopper – West and Central Africa
- Isoteinon anomoeus (Plötz, 1879) – yellow hopper – West Africa
- Isoteinon bruno Evans, 1937 – Democratic Republic of Congo (contra "Tanzania")
- Isoteinon inornatus (Trimen, 1864) – modest sylph – South Africa
- Isoteinon lamprospilus C. Felder & R. Felder, 1862. – China, Japan, etc.
- Isoteinon punctulata (Butler, 1895) – West and Central Africa
