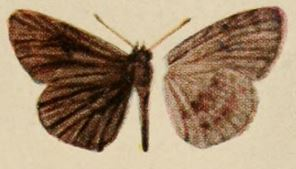

Scientific classification
- Kingdom: Animalia
- Phylum: Arthropoda
- Clade: Pancrustacea
- Class: Insecta
- Order: Lepidoptera
- Family: Hesperiidae
- Genus: Isoteinon
- Species: I. abjecta

Binomial name
- Isoteinon abjecta (Snellen, 1872)

Synonyms
- List: Cyclopedes abjecta Snellen, 1872; Pamphila abjecta (stated by some as protonym); Steropes furvus Mabille, 1890; Cyclopides uniformis Karsch, 1893; Leptalina niangarensis Holland, 1920; Astictopterus abjecta (Snellen, 1872)

= Isoteinon abjecta =

Species of butterfly

Isoteinon abjecta, the abject hopper, is a species of butterfly in the family Hesperiidae. It is found in Senegal, the Gambia, Guinea, Sierra Leone, Liberia, Ivory Coast, Ghana, Togo, Nigeria, Cameroon, the Republic of the Congo, Angola, the Democratic Republic of the Congo (Mayoumbe) and Zambia. The habitat consists of forests and humid Guinea savanna.

Torben Larsen developed a species numbering system for his 2005 publication Butterflies of West Africa. This species is #1277. The 'Larsen' numbers have since been used with permission in A Sharp Eye on Butterflies of Ghana.
