= Herbaspirillum seropedicae =

Scientific classification
- Domain: Bacteria
- Kingdom: Pseudomonadati
- Phylum: Pseudomonadota
- Class: Betaproteobacteria
- Order: Burkholderiales
- Family: Oxalobacteraceae
- Genus: Herbaspirillum
- Species: H. seropedicae

Binomial name
- Herbaspirillum seropedicae (Leifson 1962) Ding and Yokota 2004

Species of bacterium

Herbaspirillum seropedicae is a betaproteobacteria which is an endophytic diazotroph and forms nitrogen-fixing associations with maize (Zea mays), rice (Oryza sativa), sorghum (Sorghum bicolor), sugar cane (Saccharum officinarum), bananas (Musa) and pineapple (Ananas comosus). H. seropedicae is a potential nitrogen biofertilizer. Studies have shown that rice with H. seropedicae inoculated increases the yield to an equivalent of 40 kg N/ha.
