= Herbaspirillum =

Scientific classification
- Domain: Bacteria
- Kingdom: Pseudomonadati
- Phylum: Pseudomonadota
- Class: Betaproteobacteria
- Order: Burkholderiales
- Family: Oxalobacteraceae
- Genus: Herbaspirillum; Baldani et al. 1986

Type species
- Herbaspirillum seropedicae

Species
- H. aquaticum H. autotrophicum H. chlorophenolicum H. frisingense H. hiltneri H. huttiense H. lusitanum H. massiliense H. rhizosphaerae H. rubrisubalbicans H. seropedicae

Genus of bacteria

Herbaspirillum is a genus of bacteria, including the nitrogen-fixing Herbaspirillum lusitanum.

Although usually found in soil environments, it has also been identified as a contaminant of DNA extraction kit reagents, which may lead to its erroneous appearance in microbiota or metagenomic datasets.
