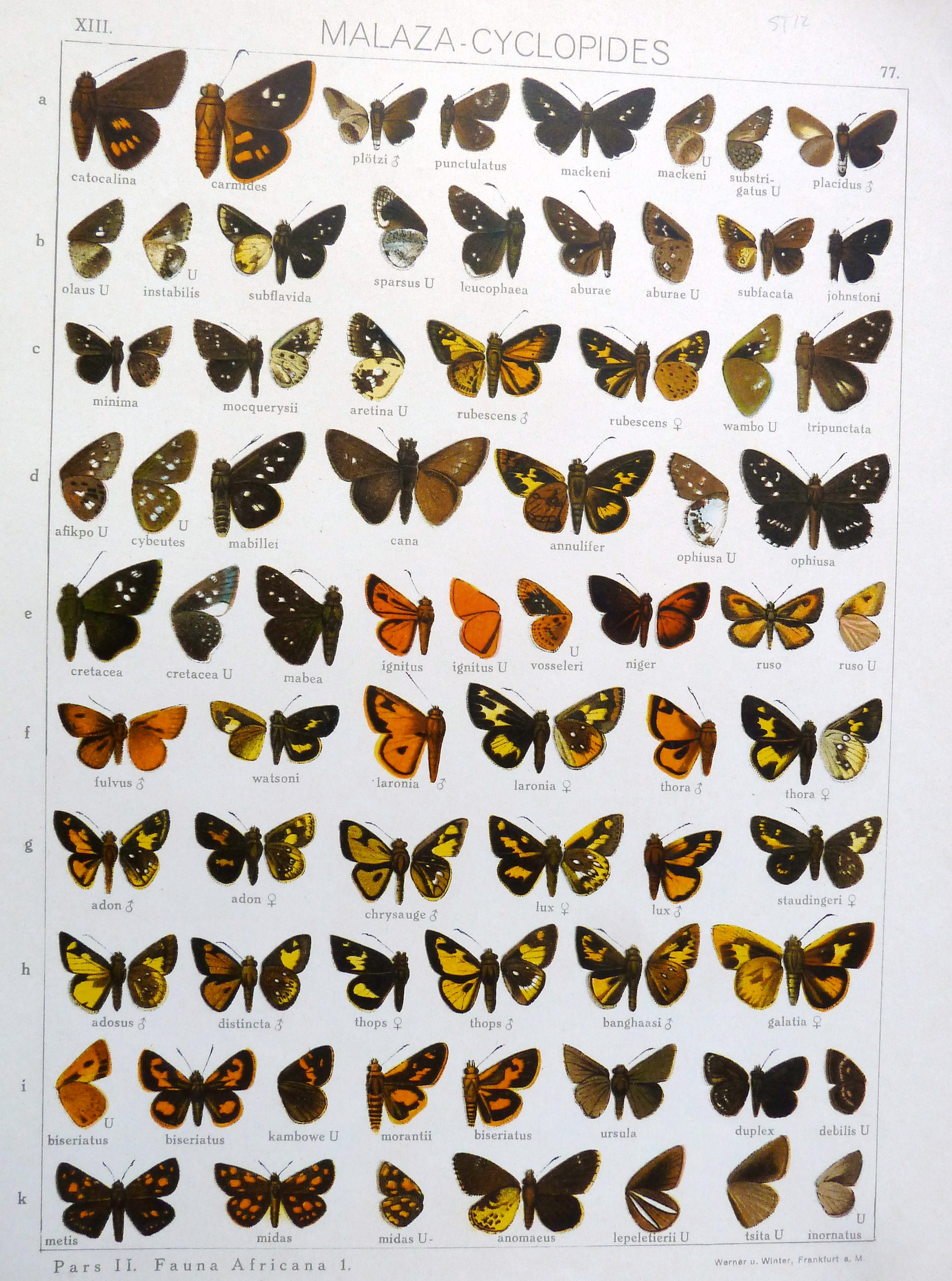

Scientific classification
- Kingdom: Animalia
- Phylum: Arthropoda
- Class: Insecta
- Order: Lepidoptera
- Family: Hesperiidae
- Genus: Isoteinon
- Species: I. inornatus

Binomial name
- Isoteinon inornatus (Trimen, 1864)

Synonyms
- Cyclopides inornatus Trimen, 1864; Astictopterus inornatus (Trimen, 1864)

= Isoteinon inornatus =

Species of butterfly

Isoteinon inornatus, the modest sylph, is a species of butterfly in the family Hesperiidae. In some works it is listed under Astictopterus inornatus (Trimen, 1864). It is found in South Africa in Afromontane forests from the East Cape, east along the Drakensberg foothills to the KwaZulu-Natal midlands and the coastal forests and rivers.

The wingspan is 24–29 mm for males and 27–29 mm for females. Adults are on wing from September to April (with a peak in January). There are multiple generations per year.

The larvae feed on Imperata cylindrica and Imperata arundinacea.
