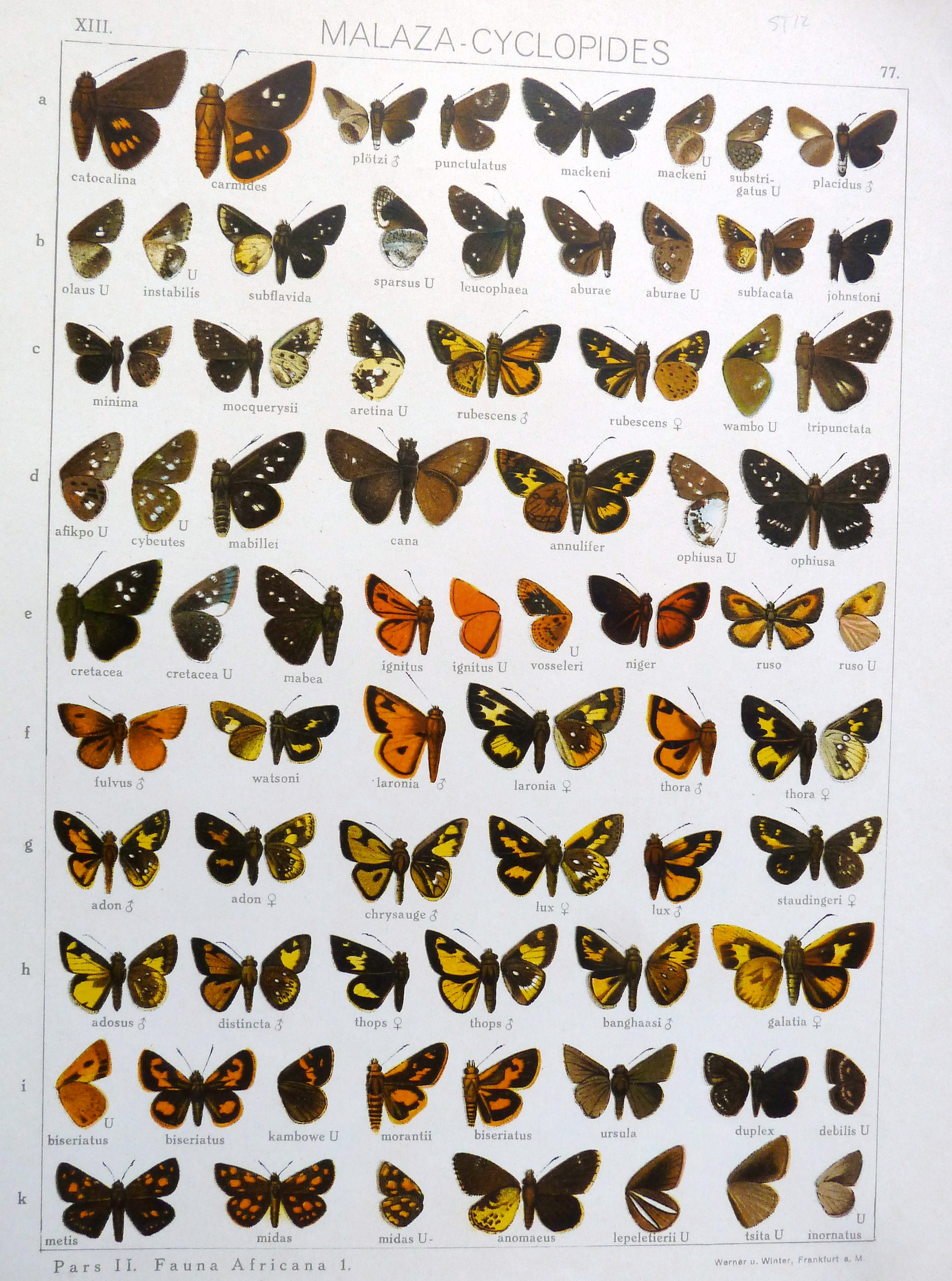

Scientific classification
- Kingdom: Animalia
- Phylum: Arthropoda
- Class: Insecta
- Order: Lepidoptera
- Family: Hesperiidae
- Genus: Isoteinon
- Species: I. punctulata

Binomial name
- Isoteinon punctulata (Butler, 1895)

Synonyms
- Ceratrichia punctulata Butler, 1895; Astictopterus punctulata (Butler, 1895)

= Isoteinon punctulata =

Species of butterfly

Astictopterus punctulata is a species of butterfly in the family Hesperiidae. It is named Astictopterus punctulata (Butler, 1895) in some works. It is found in Cameroon, the Democratic Republic of the Congo, Uganda, Tanzania and northern Zambia. The habitat consists of Brachystegia and Uapaca woodland.
