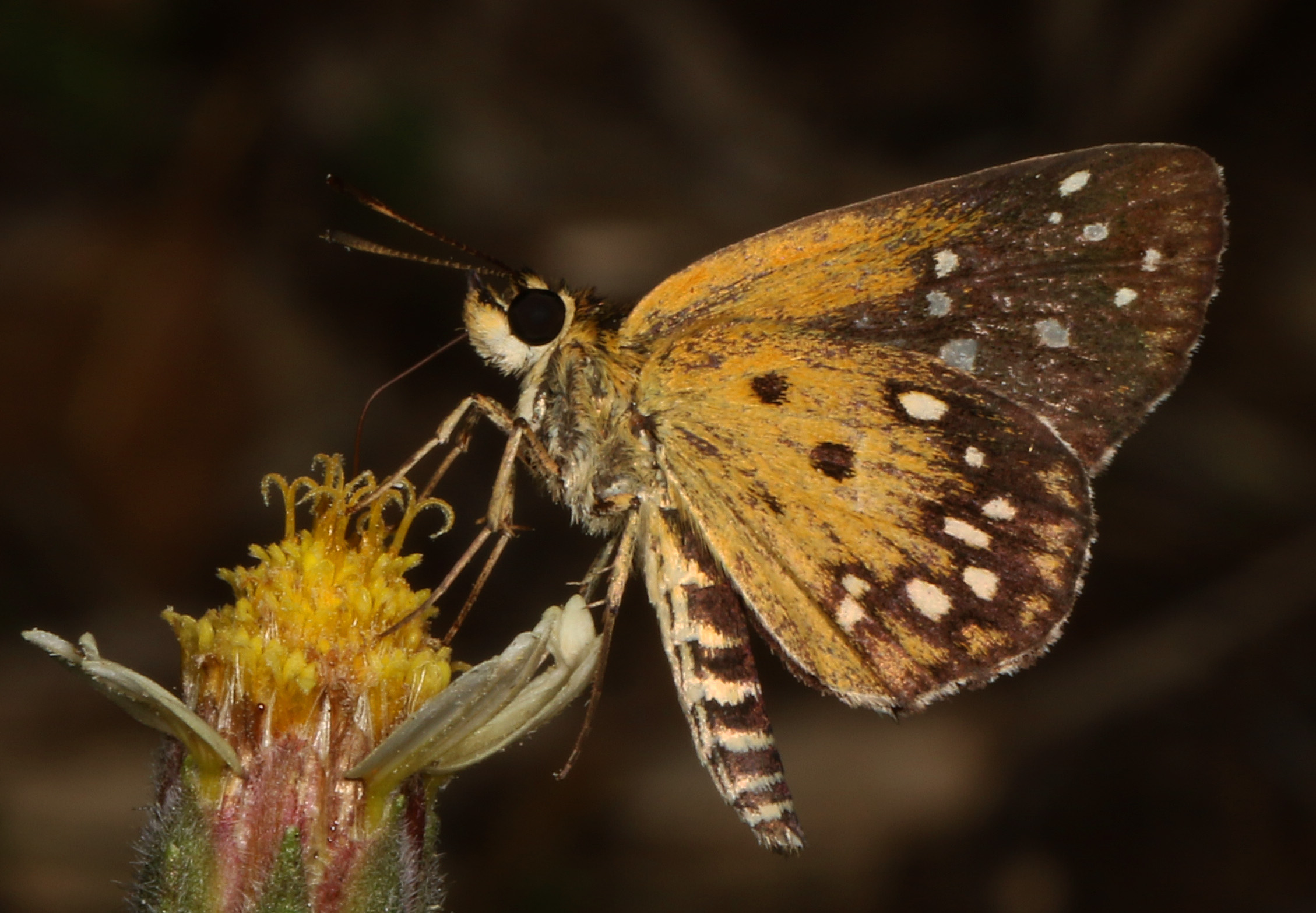
- At Gorongosa N. P., Mozambique

Scientific classification
- Kingdom: Animalia
- Phylum: Arthropoda
- Class: Insecta
- Order: Lepidoptera
- Family: Hesperiidae
- Genus: Dotta
- Species: D. stellata

Binomial name
- Dotta stellata (Mabille, 1891)

Synonyms
- Ceratrichia stellata Mabille, 1891; Cyclopides mineni Trimen, 1894; Astictopterus stellata (Mabille, 1891)

= Dotta stellata =

Spangled sylph

Species of butterfly

Dotta stellata, the spangled sylph, spotted sylph or spangled skipper, is a species of butterfly in the family Hesperiidae. It is found in Kenya, Tanzania, Malawi, Zambia, Mozambique and Zimbabwe. The habitat consists of forests.

Adults are on wing in August and again from January to April in two generations per year.

The larvae feed on Asystasia species.

== Subspecies ==
- Dotta stellata stellata - coast of Kenya
- Dotta stellata amania Evans, 1947 - Tanzania: north-east to the Usambara, Nguru, and Uluguru mountains
- Dotta stellata mineni (Trimen, 1894) - southern Tanzania, Malawi, Zambia, Mozambique, eastern Zimbabwe
