= Dotta tura =

Scientific classification
- Kingdom: Animalia
- Phylum: Arthropoda
- Class: Insecta
- Order: Lepidoptera
- Family: Hesperiidae
- Genus: Dotta
- Species: D. tura

Binomial name
- Dotta tura (Evans, 1951)

Synonyms
- Astictopterus tura Evans, 1951

Species of butterfly

Dotta tura is a species of butterfly in the family Hesperiidae. It is found in Tanzania in the Ungaru Mountains.
