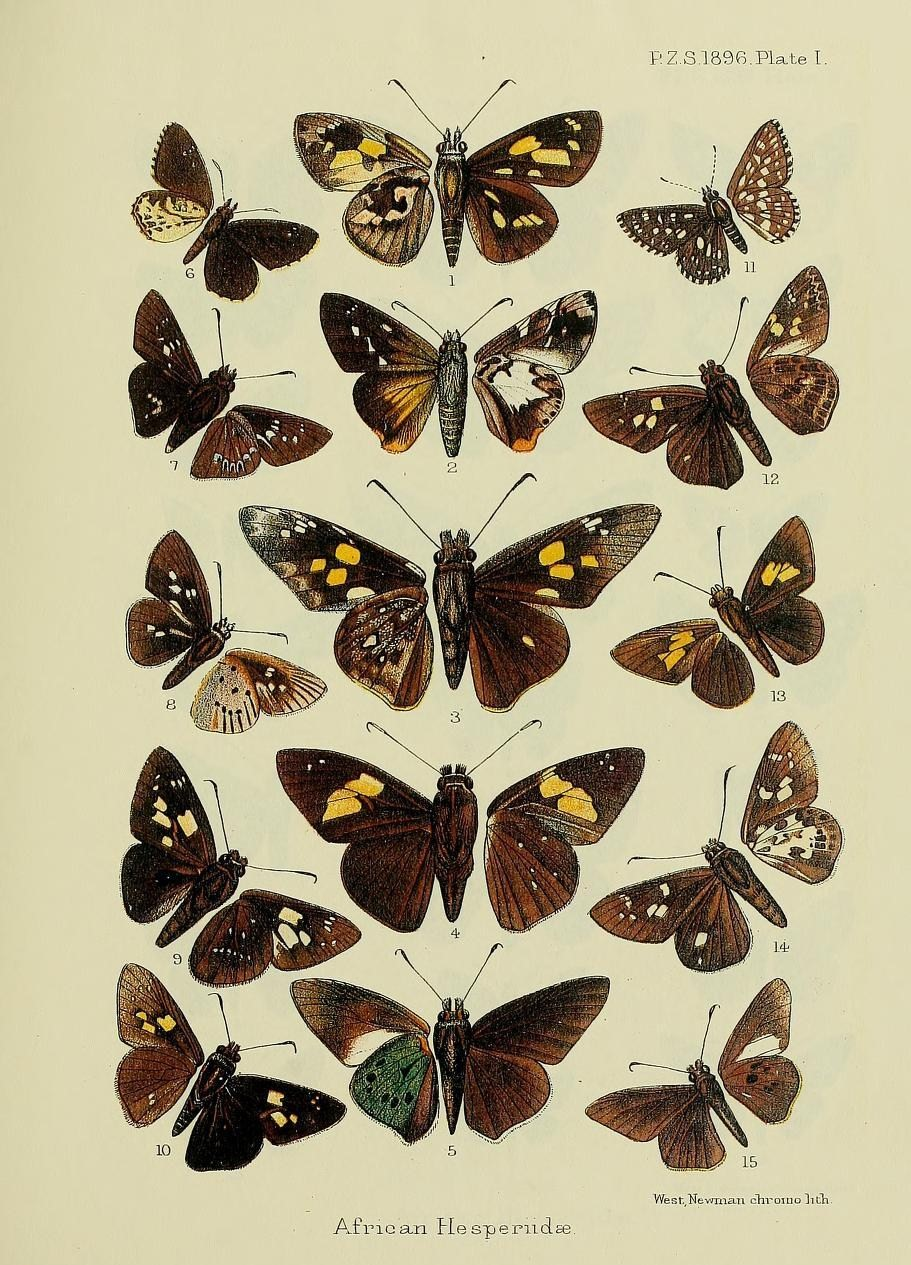
- Isoteinon anomoeus (as Cyclopedes anomoeus (Plötz, 1879), fig. 6)

Scientific classification
- Kingdom: Animalia
- Phylum: Arthropoda
- Class: Insecta
- Order: Lepidoptera
- Family: Hesperiidae
- Genus: Isoteinon
- Species: I. anomoeus

Binomial name
- Isoteinon anomoeus (Plötz, 1879)

Synonyms
- Apaustus anomoeus Plötz, 1879; Cyclopedes anomoeus (Plötz, 1879); Astictopterus anomoeus (Plötz, 1879)

= Isoteinon anomoeus =

Species of butterfly

Isoteinon anomoeus, the yellow hopper, is a species of butterfly in the family Hesperiidae. It is found in West Africa, such as Guinea, Sierra Leone, Liberia, Ivory Coast, Ghana and Togo. The preferred habitat of the species consists of wetter forests, with a broken canopy, allowing the development of grassy areas.

Adults of both sexes are attracted to flowers.
