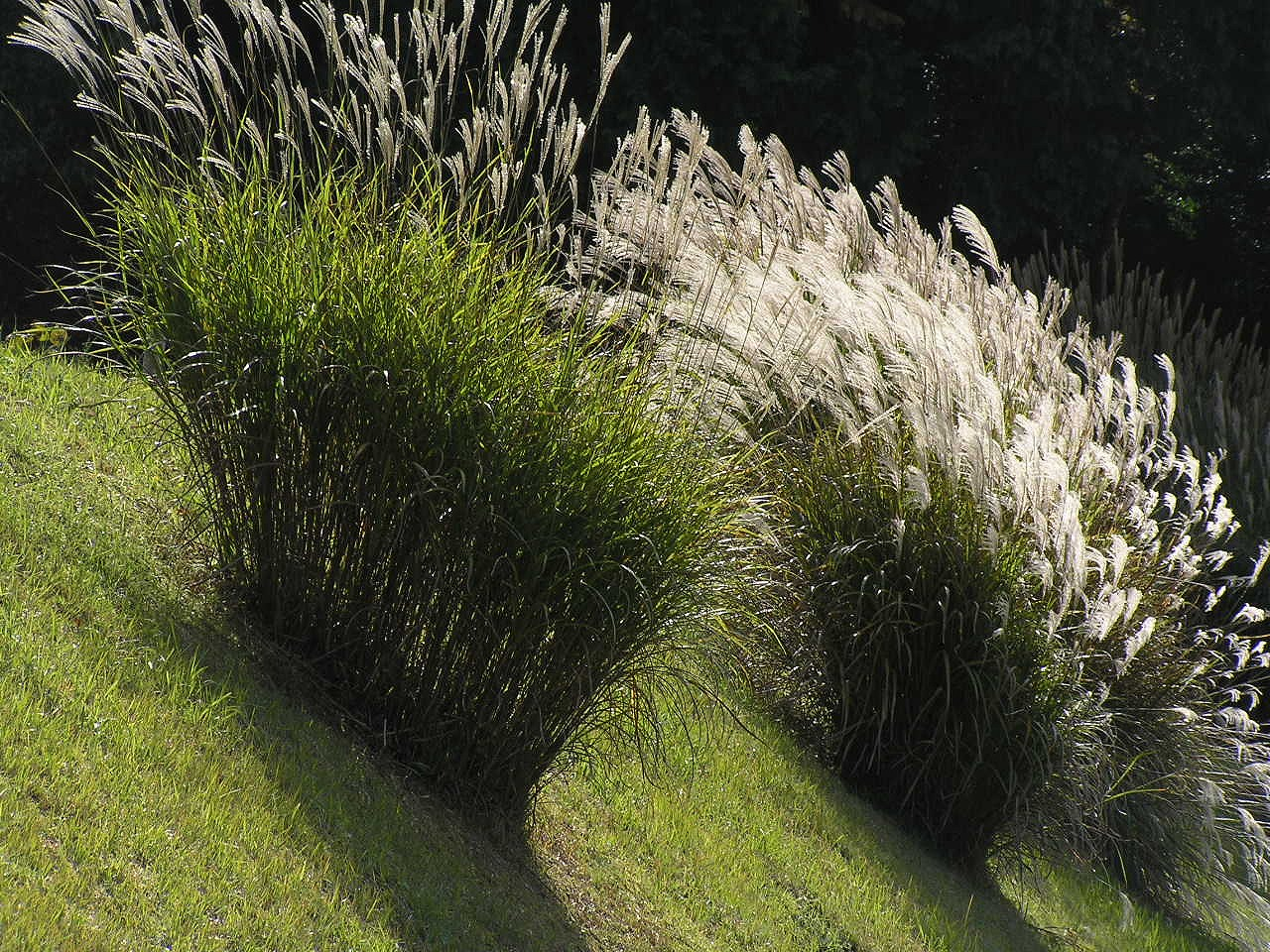

Scientific classification
- Kingdom: Plantae
- Clade: Tracheophytes
- Clade: Angiosperms
- Clade: Monocots
- Clade: Commelinids
- Order: Poales
- Family: Poaceae
- Subfamily: Panicoideae
- Genus: Miscanthus
- Species: M. sinensis

Binomial name
- Miscanthus sinensis Andersson (1855)

= Miscanthus sinensis =

Species of grass

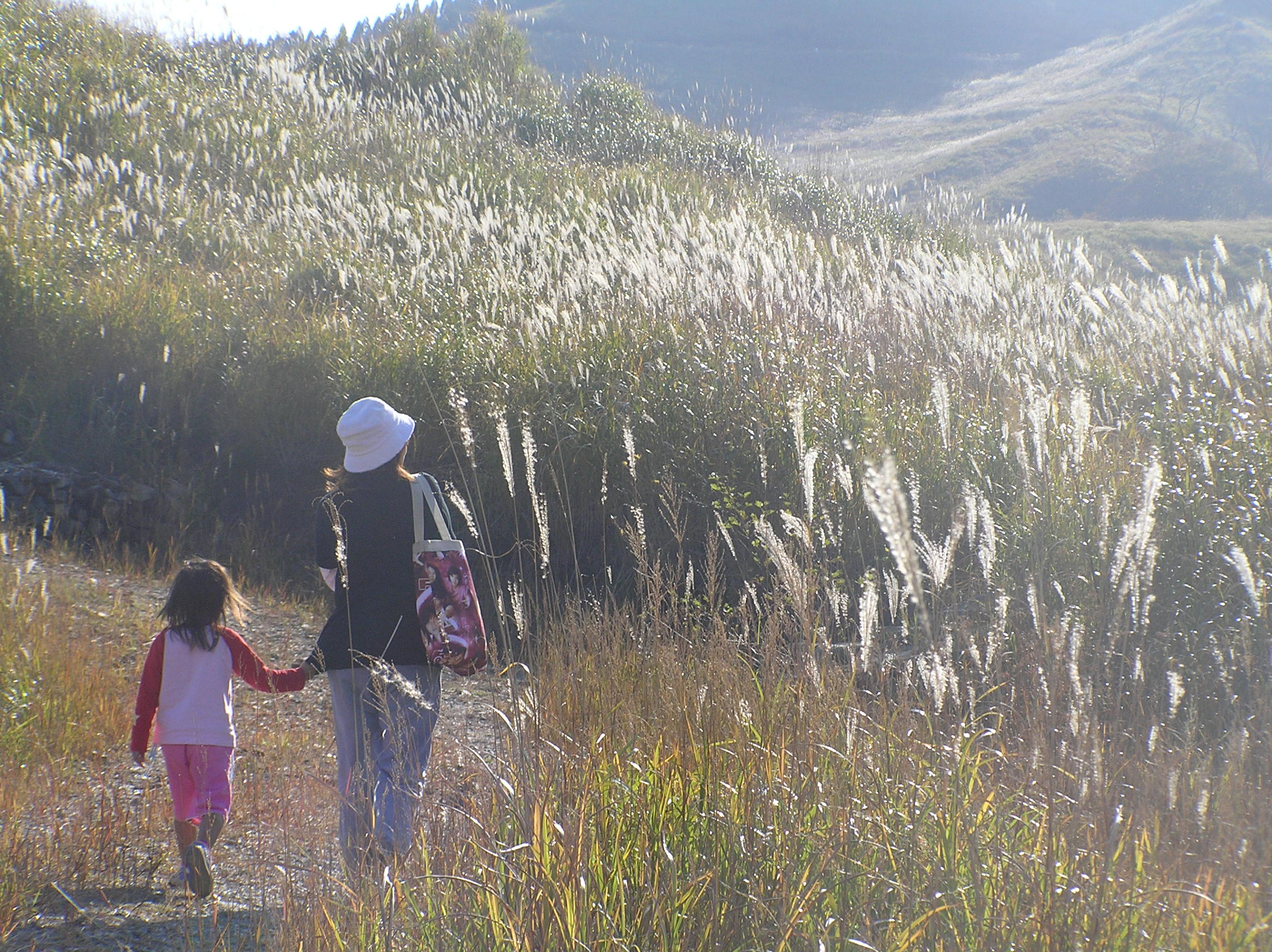
Japanese susuki of the plateau

Miscanthus sinensis, also called eulalia grass, Chinese silver grass, or elephant grass, is a species of flowering plant in the grass family Poaceae, native to most of East Asia (China, Japan, Taiwan and Korea) and Southeast Asia (the Philippines, eastern Indonesia, Malaysia, Vietnam, Thailand, and Laos).

== Description ==
It is an herbaceous perennial grass, growing to 0.8–2 m (3–7 ft) tall, rarely 4 m (13 ft), forming dense clumps from an underground rhizome. The leaves are 18–75 cm (7–30 in) tall and 0.3–2 cm broad. The flowers are purplish, held above the foliage. This plant is the preferred structure for the nesting of some species of paper wasps, such as Ropalidia fasciata.

Its growth is enhanced by its endophytic relationship with herbaspirillum frisingense.

== Nomenclature ==
The Latin specific epithet sinensis means "from China", though the plant is found elsewhere in eastern Asia.

== Forms and varieties ==
- M. sinensis f. glaber Honda
- M. sinensis var. gracillimus Hitchc.
- M. sinensis var. variegatus Beal
- M. sinensis var. zebrinus Beal

== Cultivation ==
It is widely cultivated as an ornamental plant in temperate climates around the world.

Miscanthus is a promising bioeconomy crop. The current cultivation area in Europe is relatively low. This is most likely due to its alternative crop status, where low knowledge about how to incorporate it into modern farming systems exist. Miscanthus can be used in unfavorable conditions, such as awkward shapes, slopes of land or relatively low soil quality. It can also play important roles for ecological services such as soil protection or when the farmer can use the biomass on his own farm as feed for animals.

Miscanthus can be cultivated in areas where corn grows, up to an altitude of about 700 meters is optimal. Yet, Miscanthus is ideal for soils that are often too wet for traditional field crops like corn. Environmental factors such as compacted soils and poor water retention can reduce biomass production and yield for bioenergy use.

It has become an invasive species in parts of North America. However, it is possible to reduce the likelihood of escape or hybridization with extant wild M. sinensis populations with breeding and proper management.

== Fertilization of Miscanthus for yield ==
Fertilization plays a key role in achieving higher yields, with nutrient supply and soil quality being decisive factors. Nitrogen is particularly important, with an optimal application of about 60 kg of nitrogen per hectare. Additional nitrogen beyond this does not seem to improve yield significantly.

Nitrogen fertilization increases both water content and nitrogen content in the plant but does not affect its caloric value. The nitrogen content in Miscanthus also varies during the season. Other factors, such as spatial variation, soil type and soil texture, can affect nitrogen availability and thus influence yield.

Other modern technologies can enable higher yields. Due to the energy demands and the competition between food crops and non-food crops like Miscanthus, research is now focused on genetically improving these plants. In the case of Miscanthus, improvements focus on increasing cellulose production to boost overall biomass yield.

=== Cultivars ===
Several cultivars have been selected, including 'Strictus' with narrow growth habit, 'Variegata' with white margins, and ‘Zebrinus’ (sometimes incorrectly rendered as 'Zebrina') with horizontal yellow and green stripes across the leaves. Those marked agm have gained the Royal Horticultural Society's Award of Garden Merit.

- 'Border Bandit'
- 'Cosmopolitan' agm
- 'Dronning Ingrid'
- 'Ferner Osten' agm
- 'Flamingo' agm
- 'Gewitterwolke' agm
- 'Ghana' agm
- 'Gold und Silber' agm
- 'Gracillimus'
- 'Grosse Fontäne' agm
- 'Kaskade' agm
- 'Kleine Fontäne' agm
- 'Kleine Silberspinne' agm
- 'Malepartus'
- 'Morning Light' agm
- 'Septemberrot' agm
- 'Silberfeder' agm
- 'Strictus' agm
- 'Undine' agm
- 'Variegatus'
- 'Zebrinus' agm
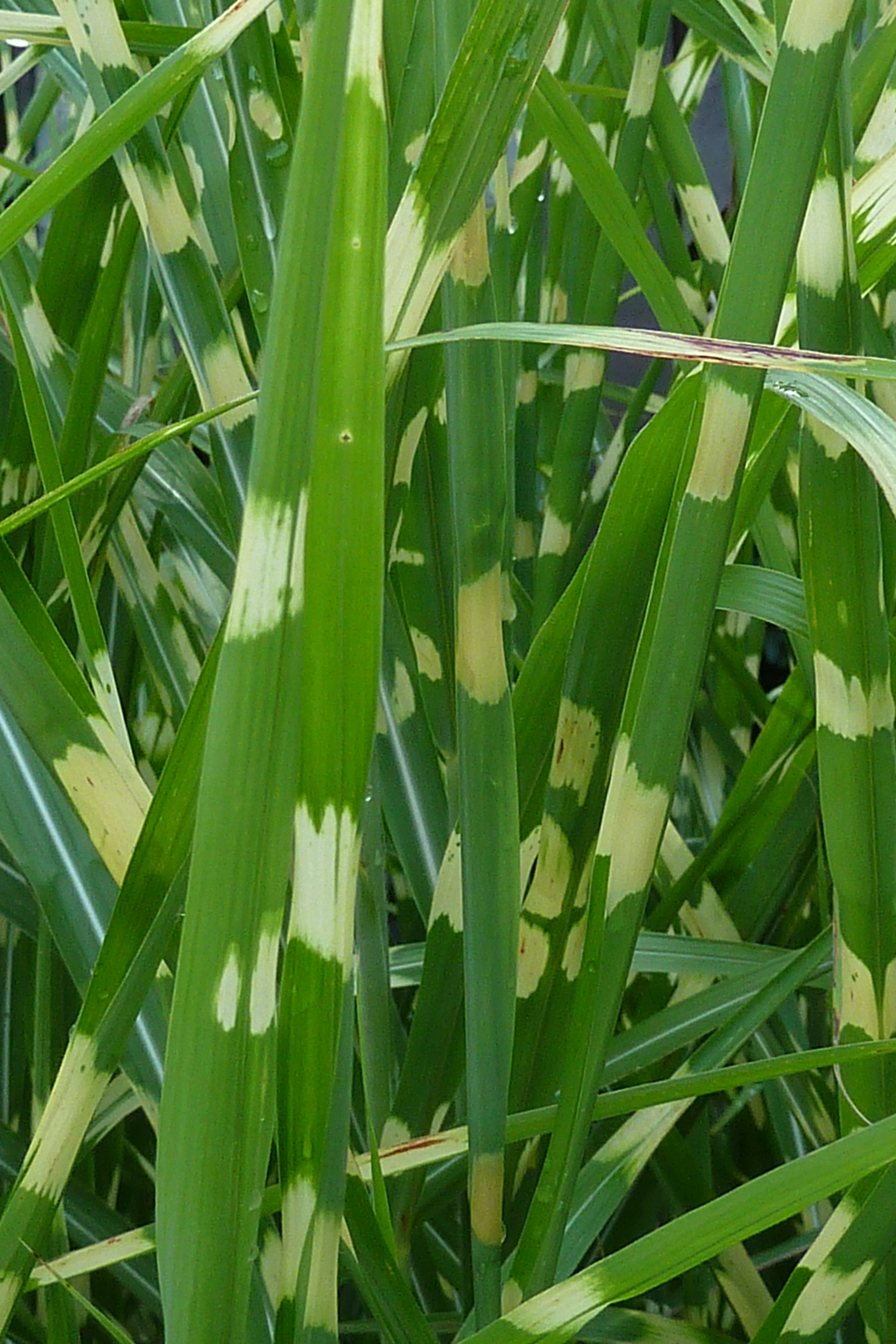
'Zebrinus'

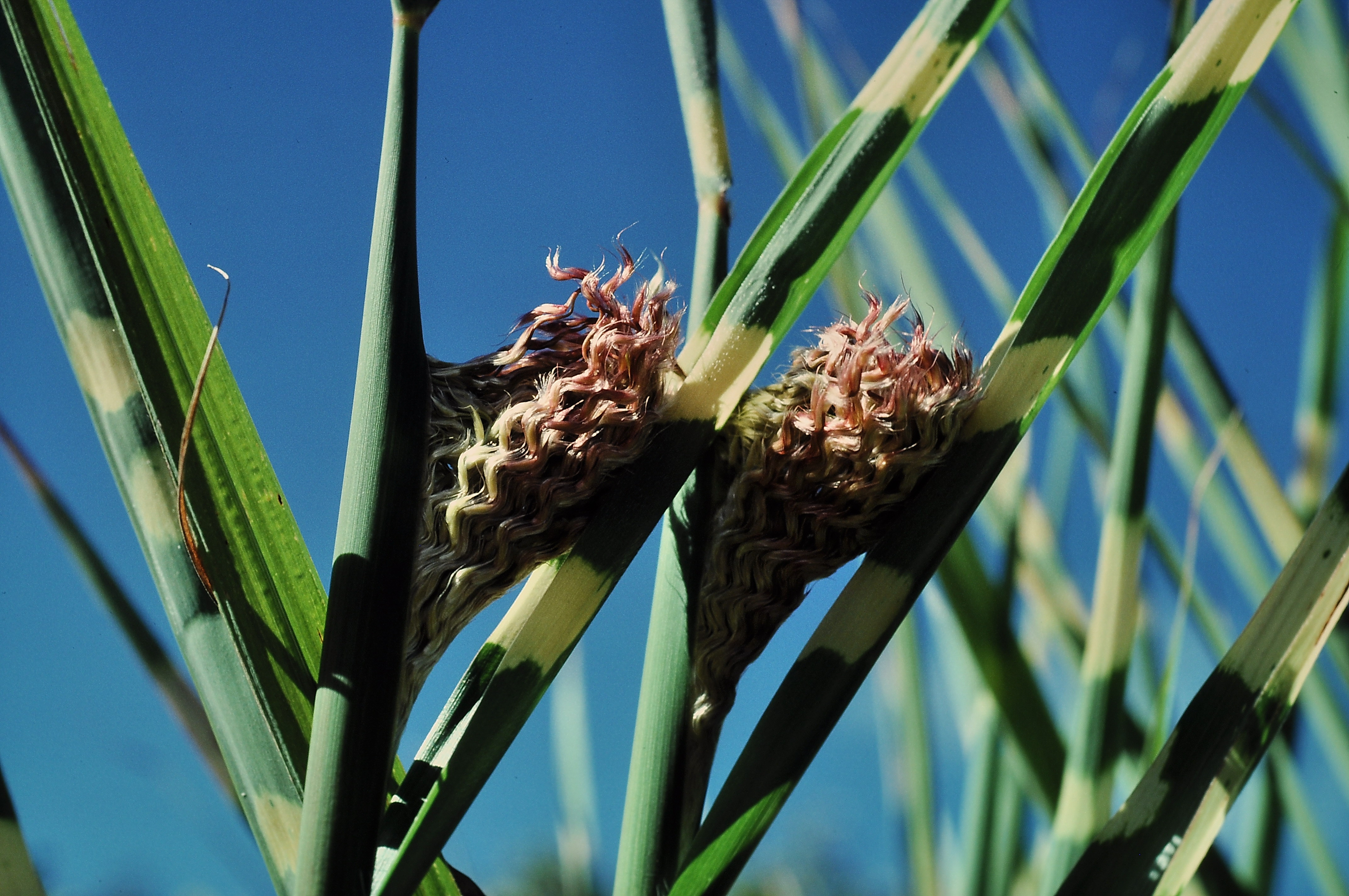
'Strictus'

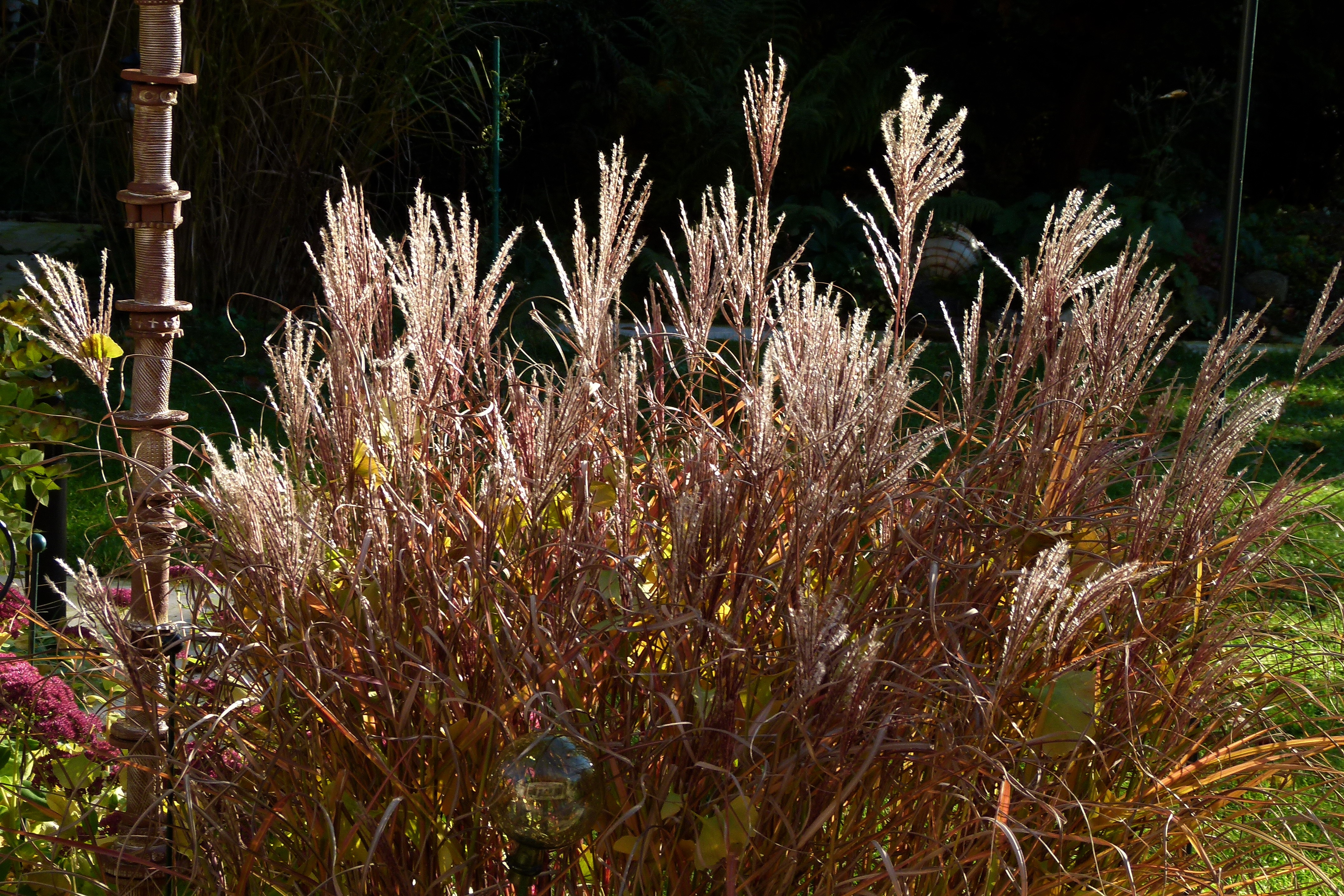
'Ferner Osten'

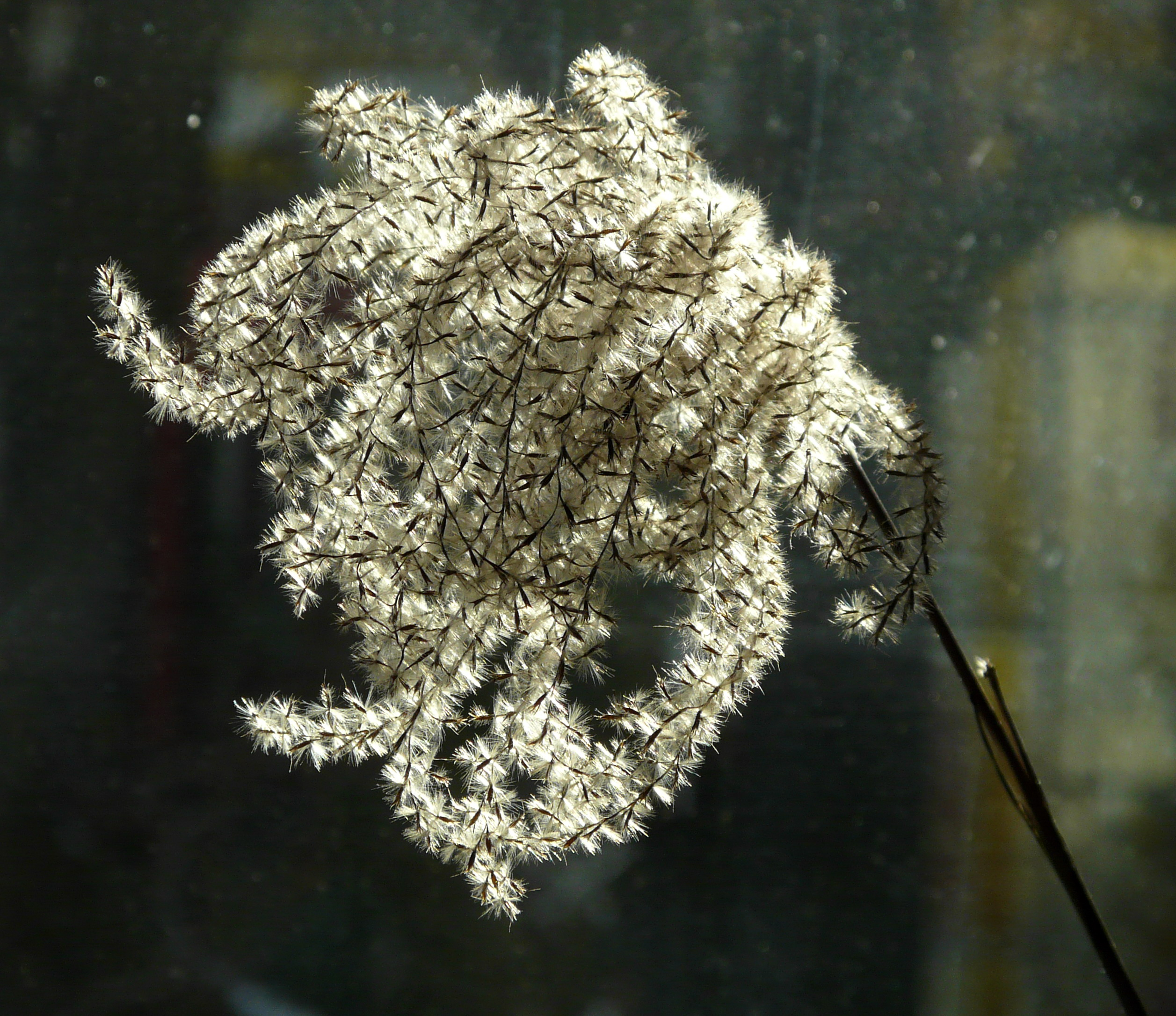
'Malepartus'

== Bioenergy uses ==
M. sinensis is a candidate for bioenergy production due to its stable yields in various climatic environments and soils, low-cost propagation by seed, effective nutrient cycling, and high genetic variation. To reduce the environmental impacts of grain-based ethanol production and increase energy security, M. sinensis plays an essential role as a renewable energy source.

The dry surface biomass of the Chinese silver grass, which is normally harvested in spring, can be burned directly in straw fire power plants for electricity production. The feedstock can also be used to produce bioethanol by fermentation or biomethane by anaerobic digestion. Bioethanol and biomethane are biofuels able to power various means of transport and represent a scalable source of alternative fuel. The harvested raw material is transported from the field to the power plant or the bioreactor in the form of big bales, chopped straw or pellets.

Lignin content in M. sinensis is hampering fermentation and affects the efficiency during bioconversion. Obtaining Chinese silver grass with low lignin content and thus promising to increase bioconversion efficiency, is possible by green crop harvesting in autumn or early winter, adequate fertilisation and breeding for favourable traits.

When developing new varieties of Miscanthus intended as a bioenergy crop, M. sinensis shows promise to be used as a source of genetic material because it is expressing favourable traits.

== Environmental benefits and carbon sequestration ==
Miscanthus sinensis shows a high potential for soil organic carbon (SOC) sequestration, especially under moderate warming scenarios (RCP 4.5). Under high warming scenarios (RCP 8.5) the SOC stocks may decline over time, because Miscanthus sinensis is better adapted to cooler climates.

Higher SOC improves soil structure, nutrient cycling, water retention, microbial activity and biodiversity which are essential for soil health, sustainability and productivity in agricultural practices. Healthier soil can build up resilience against extreme weather events, especially against soil erosion and water loss through soil structure and stability. Moreover, increased SOC in soils play an important role in climate change mitigation by helping to offset greenhouse gas emissions.

Usually, C4 carbon fixation plants have higher root exudation and rhizodeposition than Miscanthus. This suggests that the carbon dynamics in Miscanthus are dominated by recycling processes instead of carbon stabilization, meaning that not as much carbon is directly released into the soil through the roots. An important way of carbon storage in Miscanthus is through translocation of carbon into rhizomes before the crop is harvested. Additionally, carbon gets back to the soil through decomposition of plant material.

The carbon sequestration potential of Miscanthus sinensis varies by climate, soil type, management practices and land-use history. Depending on the land-use practice, a lot of carbon can be lost because of soil disturbances. The benefit of using perennial crops like Miscanthus sinensis is that there is no annual disturbance and therefore the soil has time to replace those losses. This leads to a higher stable soil carbon content. Especially in the first few decades SOC stocks can increase but might eventually decline again when returning to conventional cropping practices.

Each species of Miscanthus has its own way of carbon transfer and allocation. Miscanthus sinensis produces less yield than Miscanthus x giganteus above ground but allocates carbon below ground more efficiently, which can enhance SOC. Furthermore, Miscanthus sinensis has a higher tolerance for water stress which might also enhance the effectiveness of the carbon retention.

== Invasive potential of Miscanthus sinensis ==
Miscanthus sinensis has demonstrated significant invasive potential due to its adaptability and competitive nature. Dougherty characterized the ecological niche of Miscanthus sinensis, noting its ability to thrive in diverse environmental conditions, which contributes to its invasiveness. This adaptability allows Miscanthus sinensis to establish itself in a variety of habitats, outcompeting native species and altering local ecosystems.

Miscanthus sinensis can show competitive abilities against aggressive species like switchgrass, enabling it to outcompete other plants, reduce biodiversity, and potentially lead to monocultures. Its advantages over other plants include its tolerance to a wide range of temperatures, soil types, and moisture levels, as well as the potential for long-term seed viability.

Finally, Bonin et al. compared the establishment and productivity of Miscanthus sinensis to Miscanthus × giganteus, a similar grass species, highlighting the former's robust establishment capabilities. The research indicated that Miscanthus sinensis has a higher potential for naturalization and spread compared to Miscanthus × giganteus. This comparison underscores the need for careful consideration when selecting species for bioenergy production to avoid unintended ecological consequences.

== Synonyms ==
- Eulalia japonica Trin.
- Saccharum japonicum Thunb.

== Gallery ==
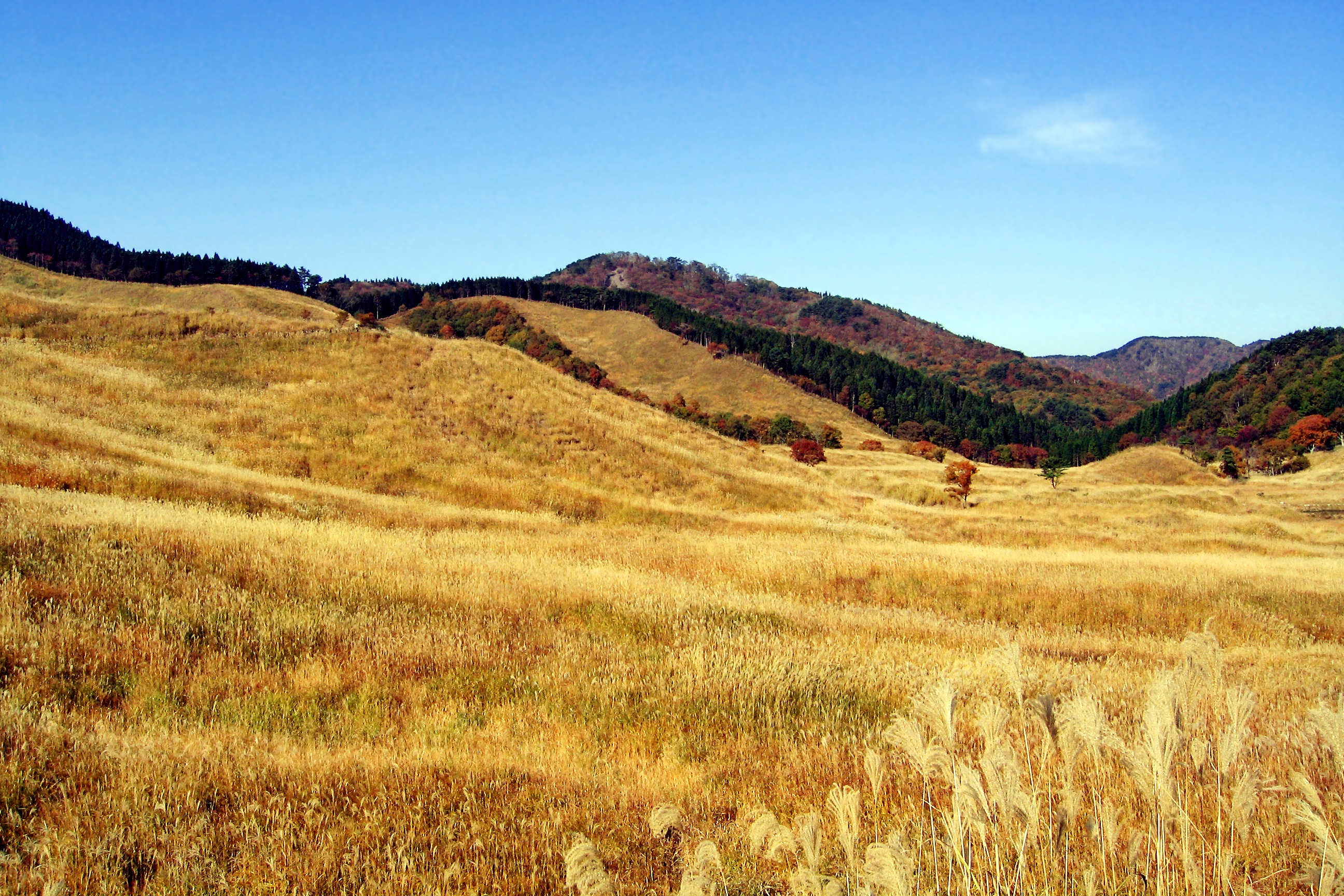
The beginning of November, on Tonomine highlands in Kamikawa, Hyogo, Japan

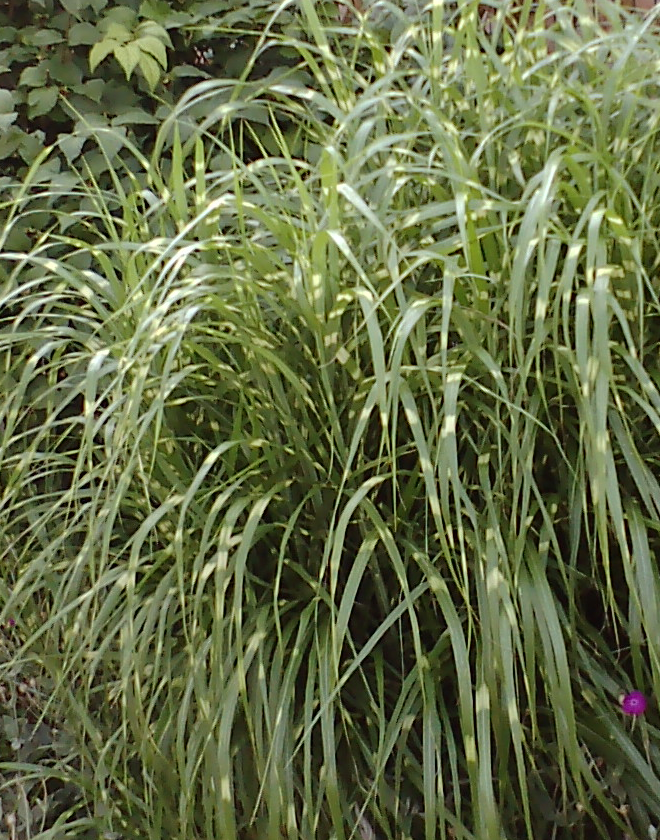
Plant with horizontal variegations

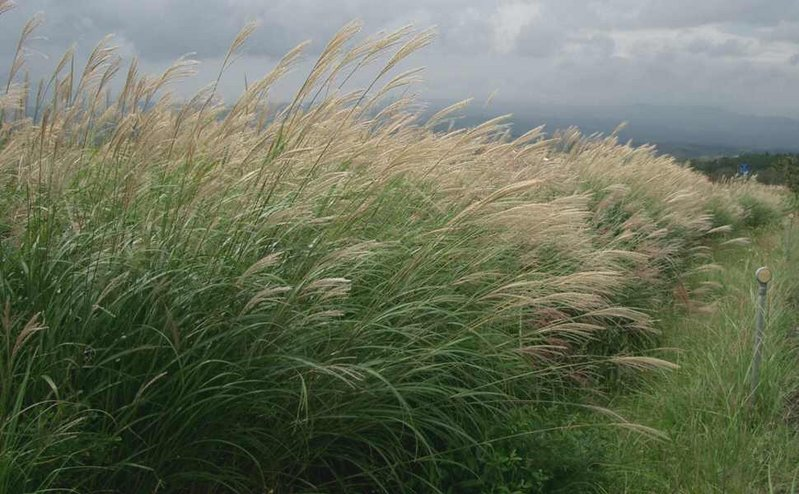

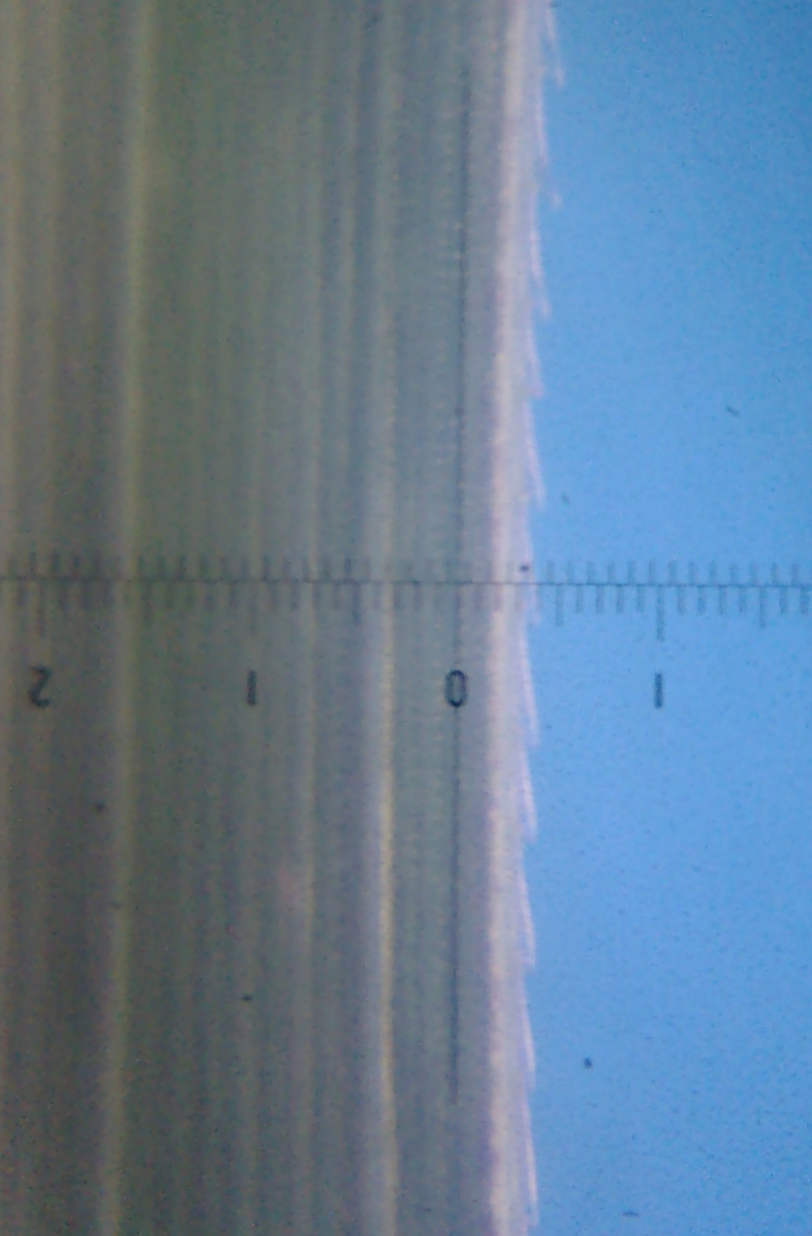
Magnified view of leaf;
0 to 1 = 1 mm; the saw-like edge can cut human skin
