= Dotta (butterfly) =

Scientific classification
- Kingdom: Animalia
- Phylum: Arthropoda
- Class: Insecta
- Order: Lepidoptera
- Family: Hesperiidae
- Subfamily: Hesperiinae
- Tribe: Astictopterini
- Genus: Dotta; Grishin in Cong et al., 2019

Type species
- Dotta stellata (Mabille, 1891)

Genus of butterflies

Dotta is a genus of grass skippers in the family Hesperiidae. The species are known by the common name of dark sylphs. They are found in southern and eastern Africa.

== Species ==
The following species belong in the genus:

- Dotta callicles (Hewitson, 1868) –Namibia, etc.
- Dotta stellata (Mabille, 1891) –Kenya, etc.
- Dotta tura (Evans, 1951) –Tanzania
