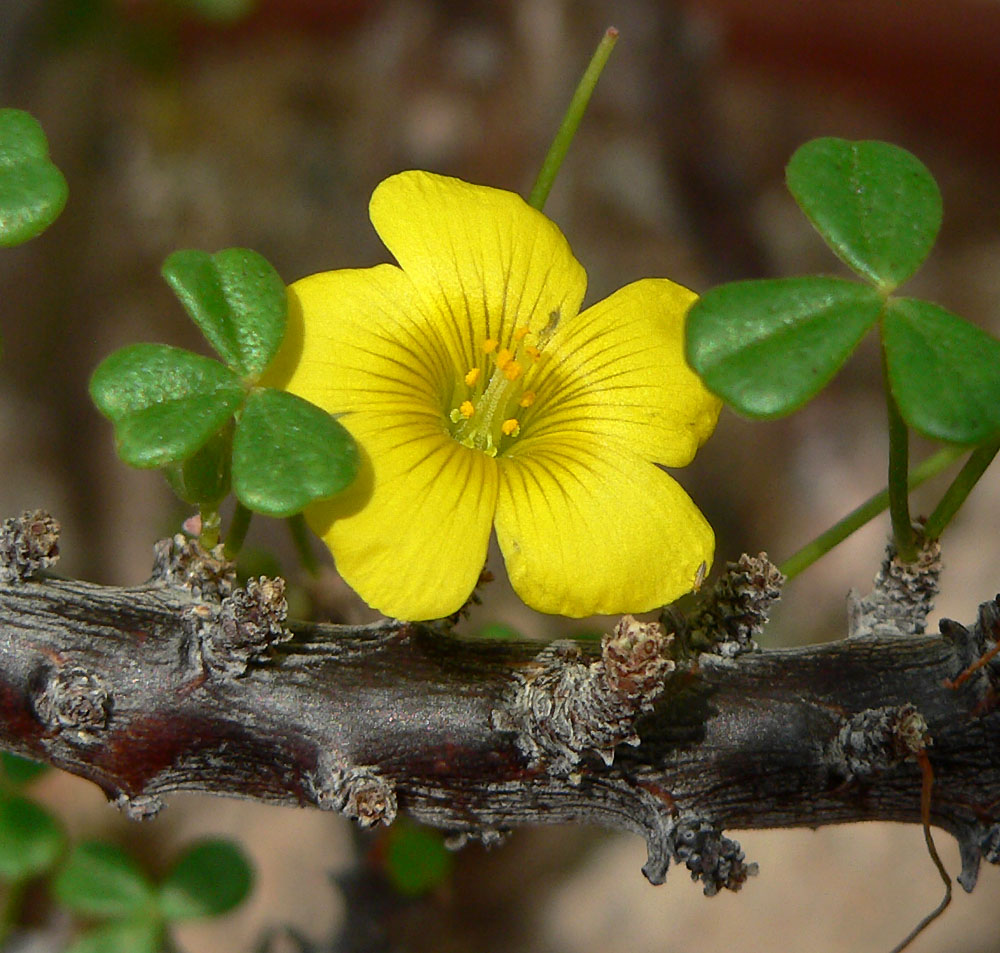

Scientific classification
- Kingdom: Plantae
- Clade: Tracheophytes
- Clade: Angiosperms
- Clade: Eudicots
- Clade: Rosids
- Order: Oxalidales
- Family: Oxalidaceae
- Genus: Oxalis
- Species: O. gigantea

Binomial name
- Oxalis gigantea Barnéoud

= Oxalis gigantea =

Species of flowering plant

Oxalis gigantea is an Oxalis species found in Regions Antofagasta, Atacama and Coquimbo of Chile. It was first described in 1845. Oxalis gigantea is a shrub pollinated by hummingbirds.

It is also called churqui and churco in Spanish.
