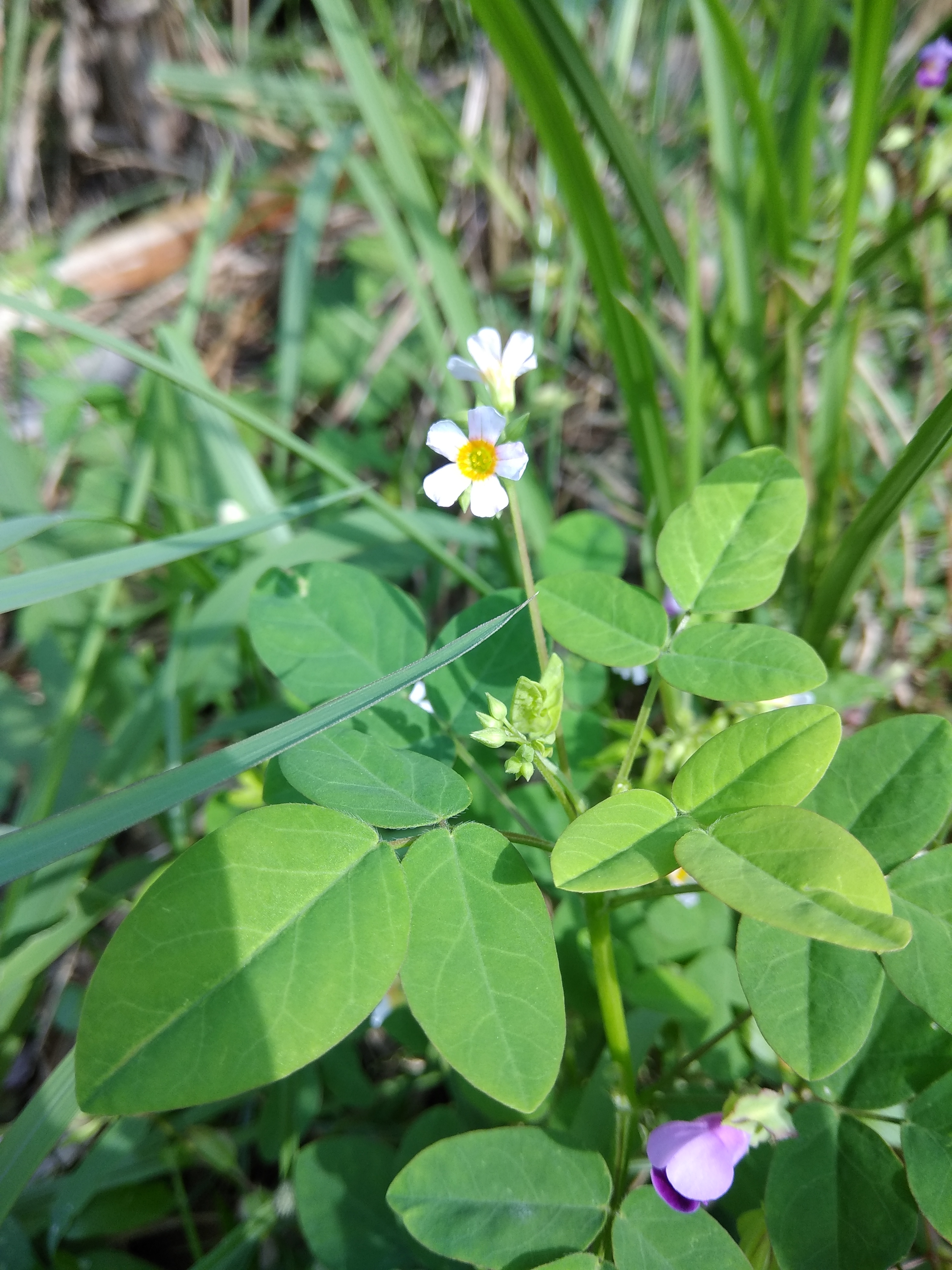
- Oxalis barrelieri

Scientific classification
- Kingdom: Plantae
- Clade: Tracheophytes
- Clade: Angiosperms
- Clade: Eudicots
- Clade: Rosids
- Order: Oxalidales
- Family: Oxalidaceae
- Genus: Oxalis
- Species: O. barrelieri

Binomial name
- Oxalis barrelieri L.

= Oxalis barrelieri =

Species of flowering plant

Oxalis barrelieri, the Barrelier's woodsorrel, or lavender sorrel, also commonly called in French trèfle, oseille-marron, or oseille-savane, is a plant from the genus Oxalis.

== Description ==
The plant grows to a height of 20–150 cm and has pink flowers with a greenish or yellow base (Smith, 1985; pp. 624–625). Leaflets on the stems generally have three leaves attached to the center (Smith, 1985; pp. 624–625).

== Distribution ==
It is native to the West Indies, as well as Central and South America. It was introduced into parts of Africa, Sri Lanka, New Guinea and Southeast Asia. It is considered a weed in the Caroline and Mariana Islands and in Samoa.
