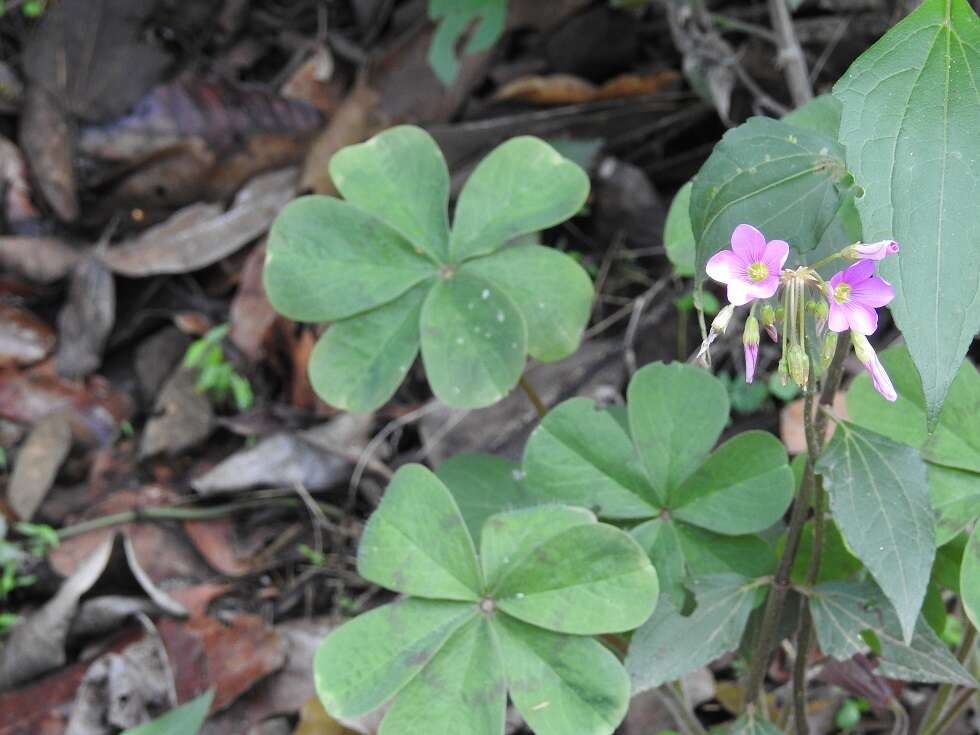
- An individual in the wild

Scientific classification
- Kingdom: Plantae
- Clade: Tracheophytes
- Clade: Angiosperms
- Clade: Eudicots
- Clade: Rosids
- Order: Oxalidales
- Family: Oxalidaceae
- Genus: Oxalis
- Species: O. nelsonii

Binomial name
- Oxalis nelsonii (Small) R.Knuth

= Oxalis nelsonii =

Species of flowering plant

Oxalis nelsonii is a species of flowering plant in the family Oxalidaceae. It is endemic to Mexico.
