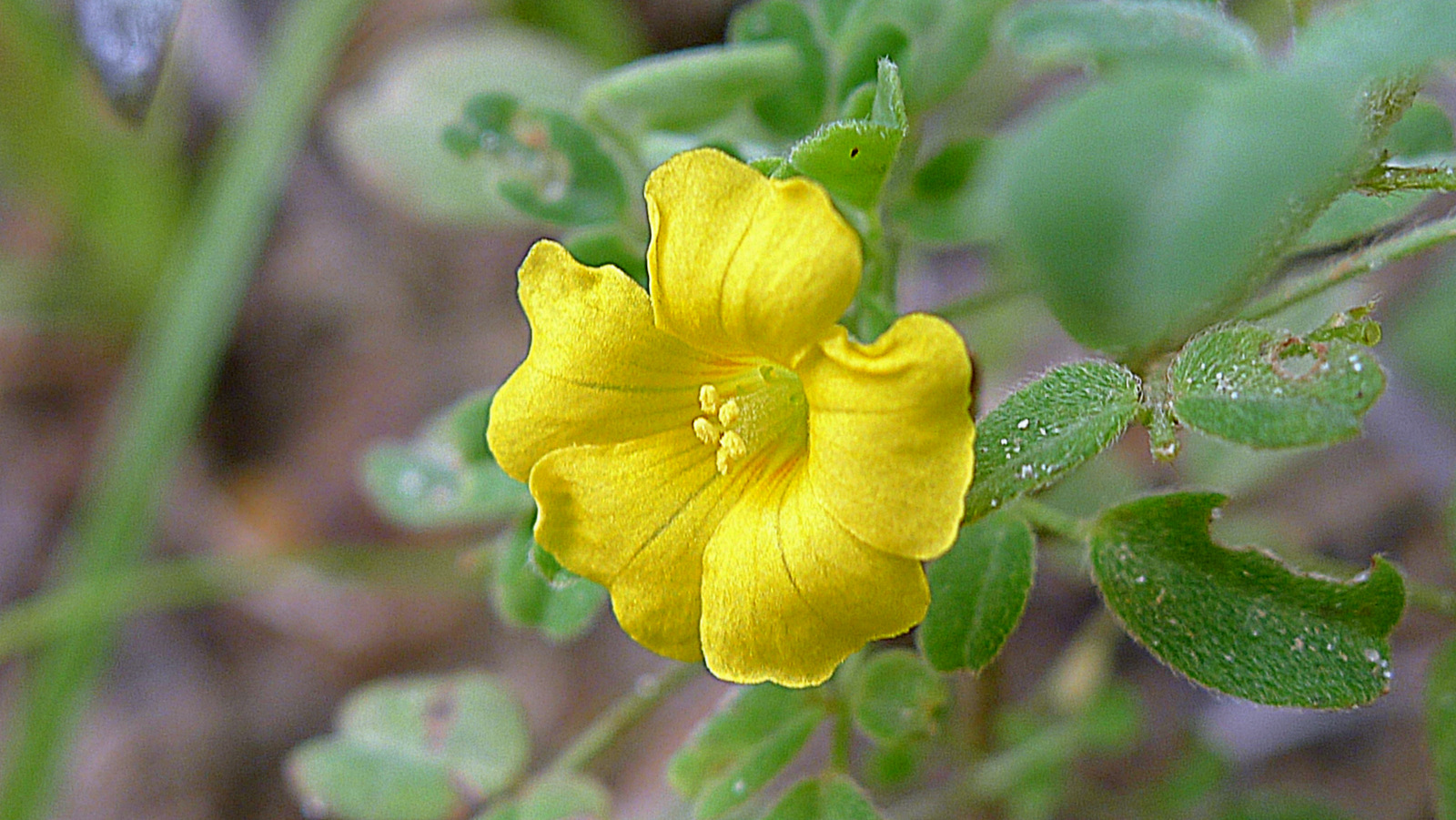
- Close-up of flower
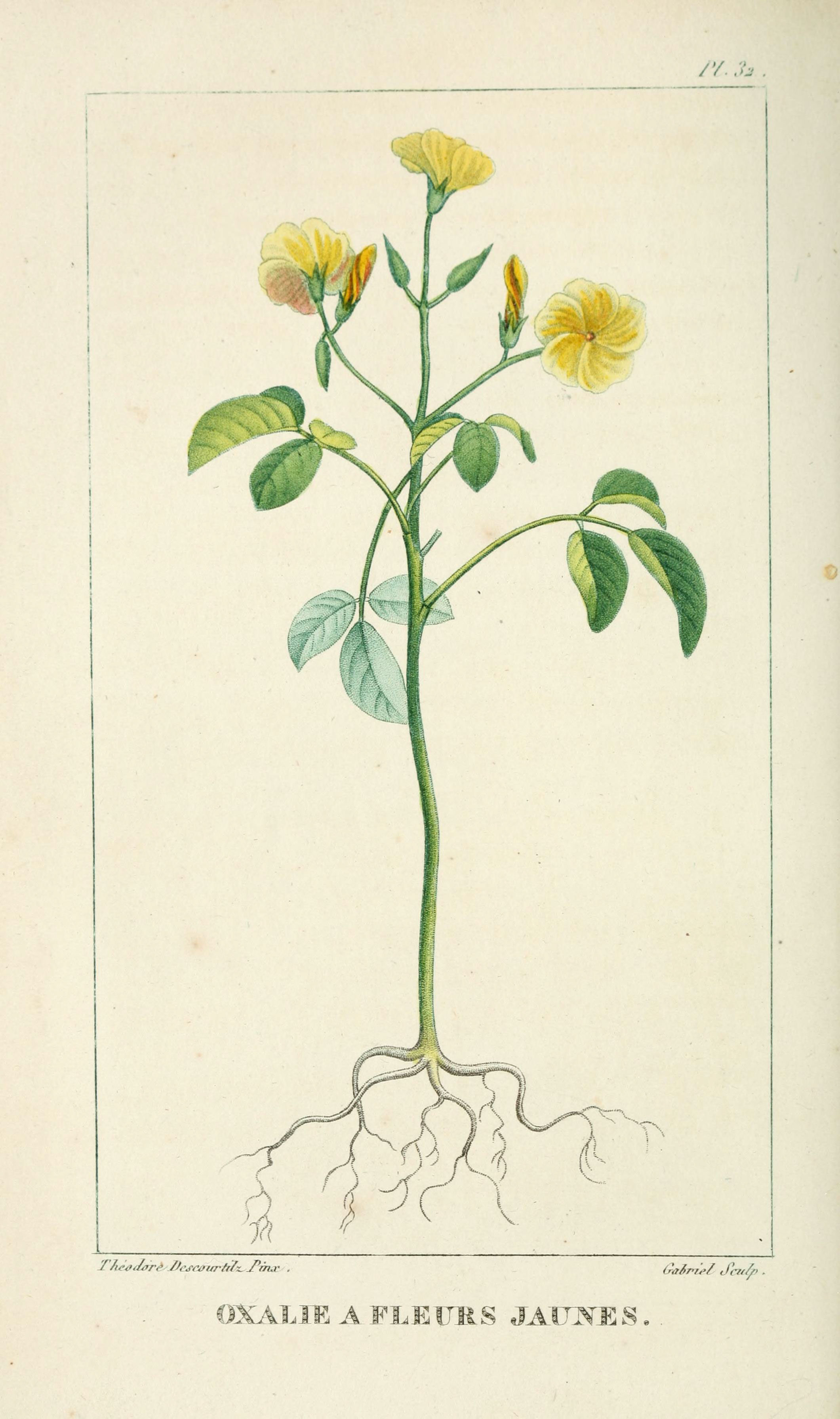
- Botanical illustration

Scientific classification
- Kingdom: Plantae
- Clade: Tracheophytes
- Clade: Angiosperms
- Clade: Eudicots
- Clade: Rosids
- Order: Oxalidales
- Family: Oxalidaceae
- Genus: Oxalis
- Species: O. frutescens

Binomial name
- Oxalis frutescens L.

Synonyms
- List: Acetosella angustifolia (Kunth) Kuntze; Acetosella bahiensis (Progel) Kuntze; Acetosella berlandieri (Torr.) Kuntze; Acetosella borjensis (Kunth) Kuntze; Acetosella diffusa Kuntze; Acetosella distans (A.St.-Hil.) Kuntze; Acetosella fasciculata (Turcz.) Kuntze; Acetosella frutescens (L.) Kuntze; Acetosella neaei (DC.) Kuntze; Acetosella pentantha (Jacq.) Kuntze; Acetosella pilosissima (Turcz.) Kuntze; Acetosella psilotricha (Turcz.) Kuntze; Acetosella schomburgkiana (Progel) Kuntze; Acetosella tephrodes (Turcz.) Kuntze; Lotoxalis angustifolia (Kunth) Rose; Lotoxalis berlandieri Small; Lotoxalis fasciculata Rose; Lotoxalis frutescens (L.) Small; Lotoxalis glabrata (Baker) Rose; Lotoxalis neaei (DC.) Rose; Lotoxalis pentantha (Jacq.) Rose; Lotoxalis psilotricha Rose; Lotoxalis tephrodes Rose; Lotoxalis yucatanensis Rose; Oxalis angustifolia Kunth; Oxalis avilensis Pittier; Oxalis bahiensis Progel; Oxalis berlandieri Torr.; Oxalis borjensis Kunth; Oxalis camporum Brandegee; Oxalis chacoensis R.Knuth; Oxalis charaguensis R.Knuth; Oxalis coarctata R.Knuth; Oxalis coccinea Woodson & Schery; Oxalis cruzeirensis R.Knuth; Oxalis descolei R.Knuth; Oxalis diffusa Pohl ex Progel; Oxalis distans A.St.-Hil.; Oxalis fasciculata Turcz.; Oxalis frutescens Ruiz & Pav. ex G.Don; Oxalis frutescens var. cicatricosa R.Knuth; Oxalis frutescens var. margaritensis R.Knuth; Oxalis frutescens subsp. pentantha (Jacq.) Lourteig; Oxalis fruticosa Willd. ex Zucc.; Oxalis glabrata (Baker) R.Knuth; Oxalis glaucifolia R.Knuth; Oxalis guatemalensis R.Knuth; Oxalis harmsiana R.Knuth; Oxalis herzogii R.Knuth; Oxalis hispida Zucc.; Oxalis jahnii Pittier; Oxalis leptophylla G.Don; Oxalis lindheimeri Torr. ex R.Knuth; Oxalis littoralis Pohl ex Progel; Oxalis mairaryensis R.Knuth; Oxalis neaei DC.; Oxalis neaei var. glabrata Baker; Oxalis nodulosa Pittier; Oxalis pentantha Jacq.; Oxalis pentantha var. humboldtii DC.; Oxalis pilosissima Turcz.; Oxalis plumieri Jacq.; Oxalis plumieri Lindl. ex Progel; Oxalis psilotricha Turcz.; Oxalis schomburgkiana Progel; Oxalis schomburgkiana var. lasiocarpa Progel; Oxalis schomburgkiana var. leiocarpa Progel; Oxalis stenomeres S.F.Blake; Oxalis sublignosa R.Knuth; Oxalis tephrodes Turcz.; Oxalis yucatanensis (Rose) R.Knuth

= Oxalis frutescens =

Species of plant

Oxalis frutescens, the shrubby woodsorrel, is a species of flowering plant in the family Oxalidaceae. It is native to New Mexico, Texas, Mexico, Central America, the southernmost Caribbean islands, and tropical South America as far as northern Argentina. A perennial subshrub reaching 35 cm (14 in), it is typically found in sandy soils in grasslands, pastures, roadsides, and open oak woodlands.

== Subtaxa ==
The following subspecies are accepted:

- Oxalis frutescens subsp. angustifolia (Kunth) Lourteig – U.S., Mexico, Central America
- Oxalis frutescens subsp. borjensis (Kunth) Lourteig – Colombia, Venezuela
- Oxalis frutescens subsp. frutescens – Mexico, Central America, Caribbean, South America
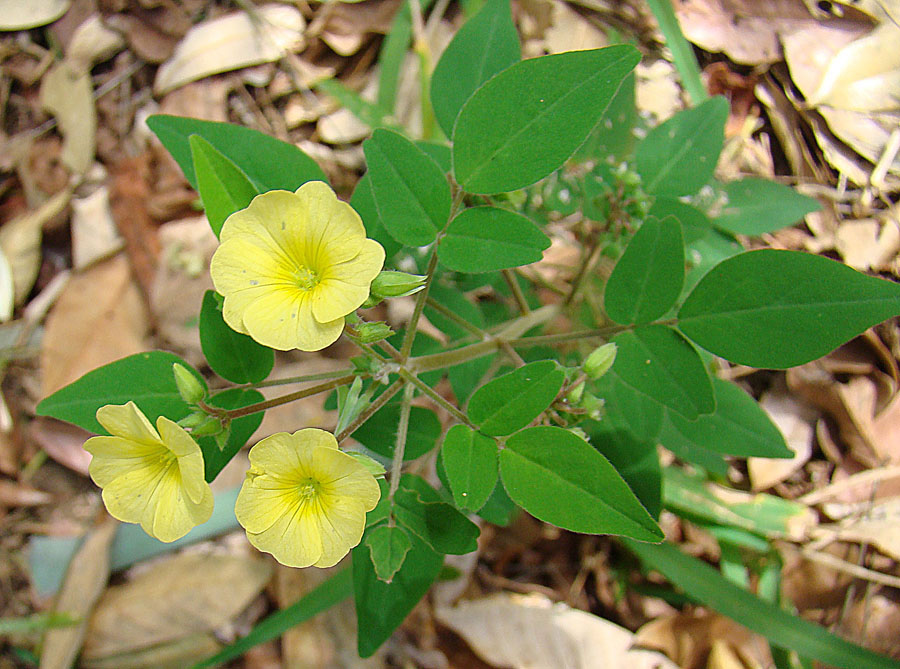
In Oaxaca, Mexico

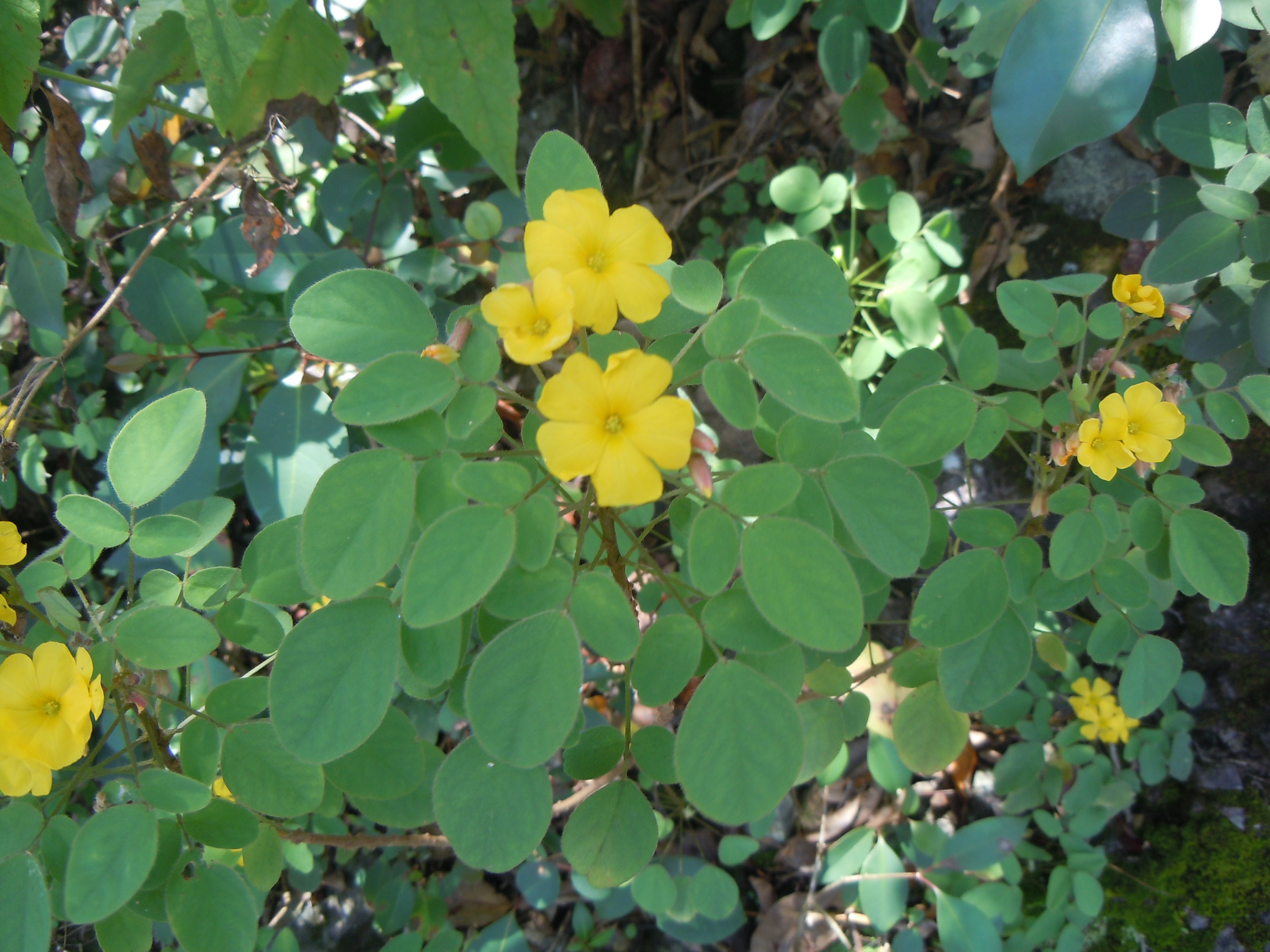
In Martinique

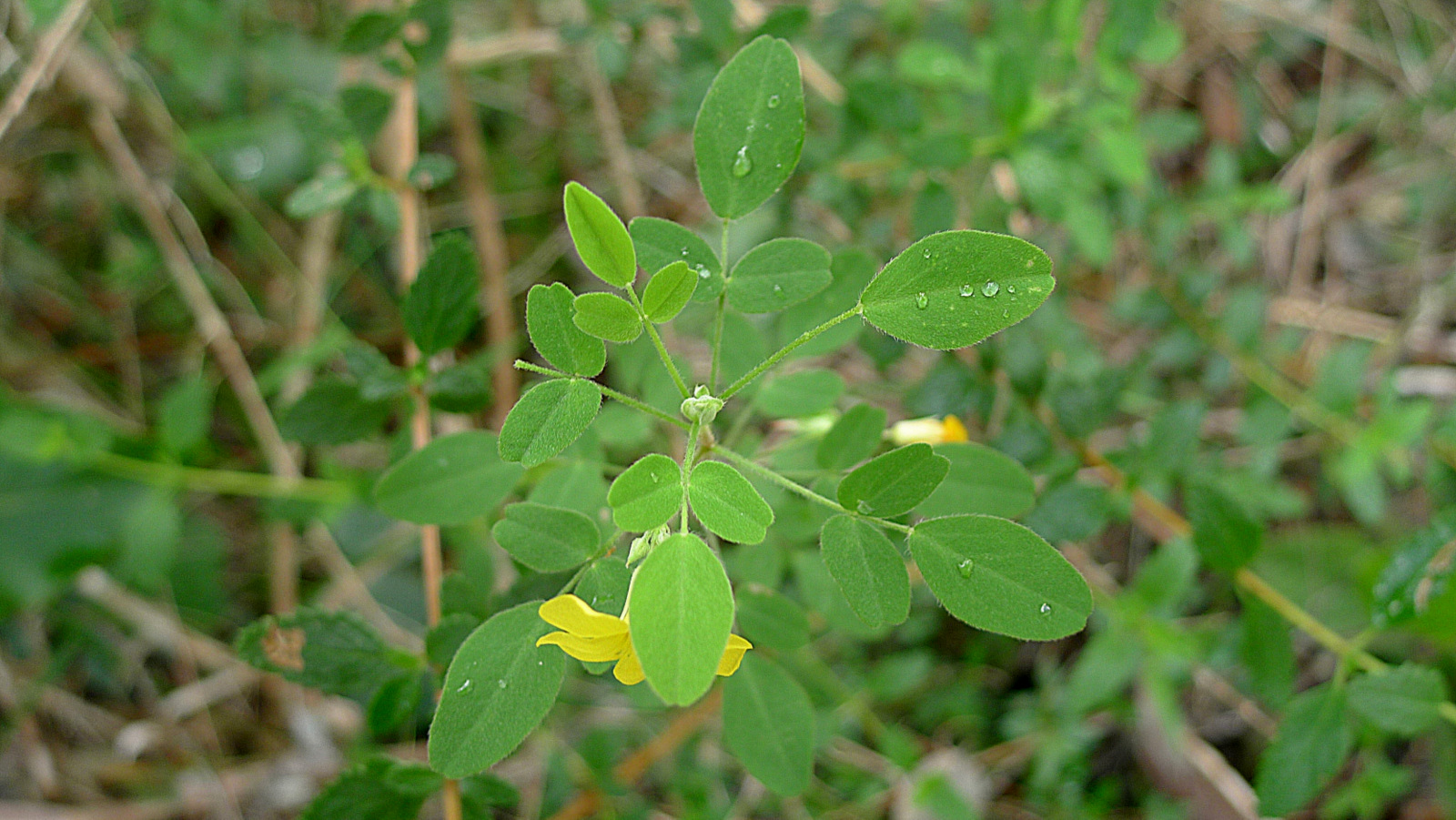
In Bahia, Brazil

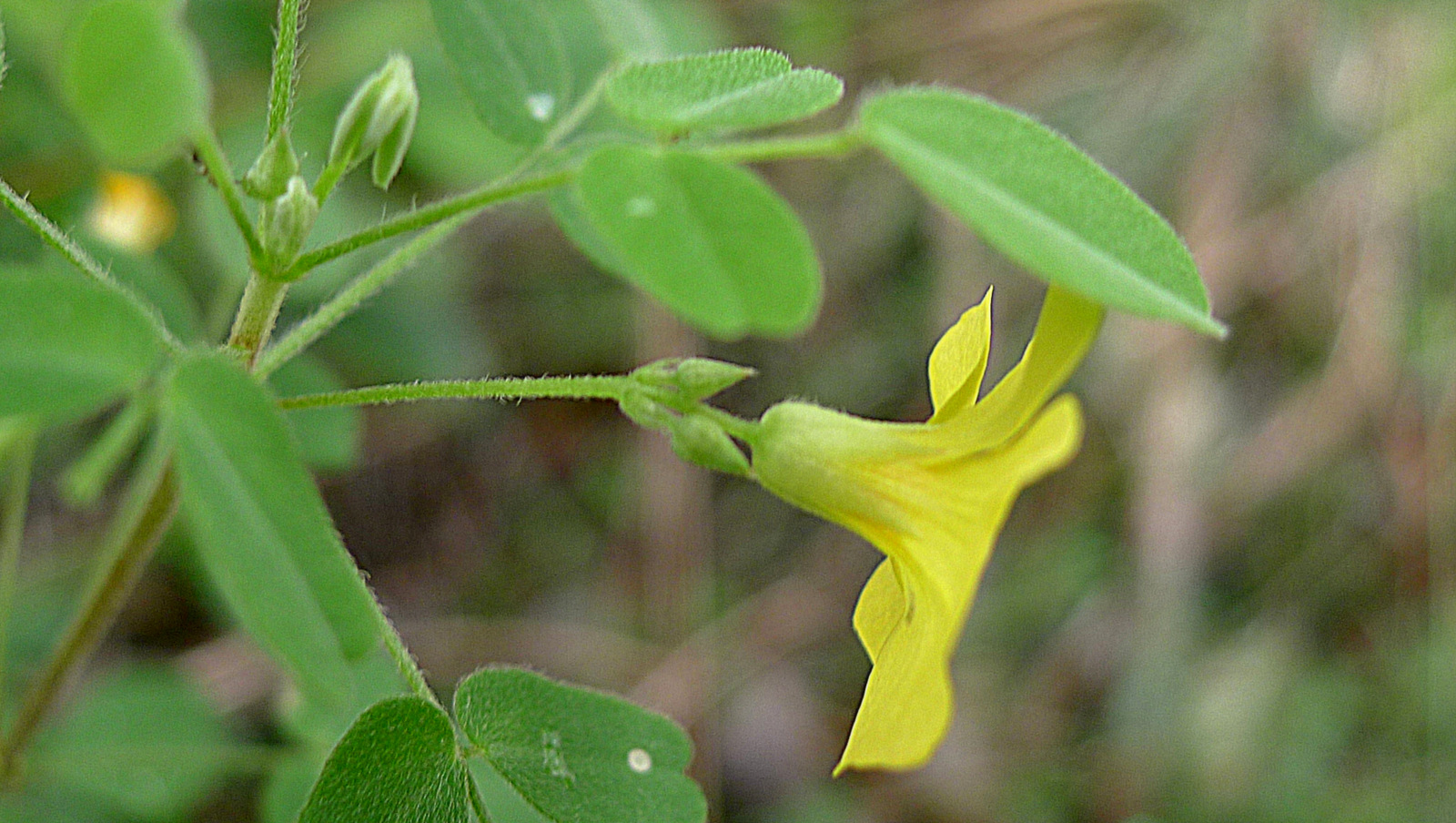
Side view of flower, Bahia
