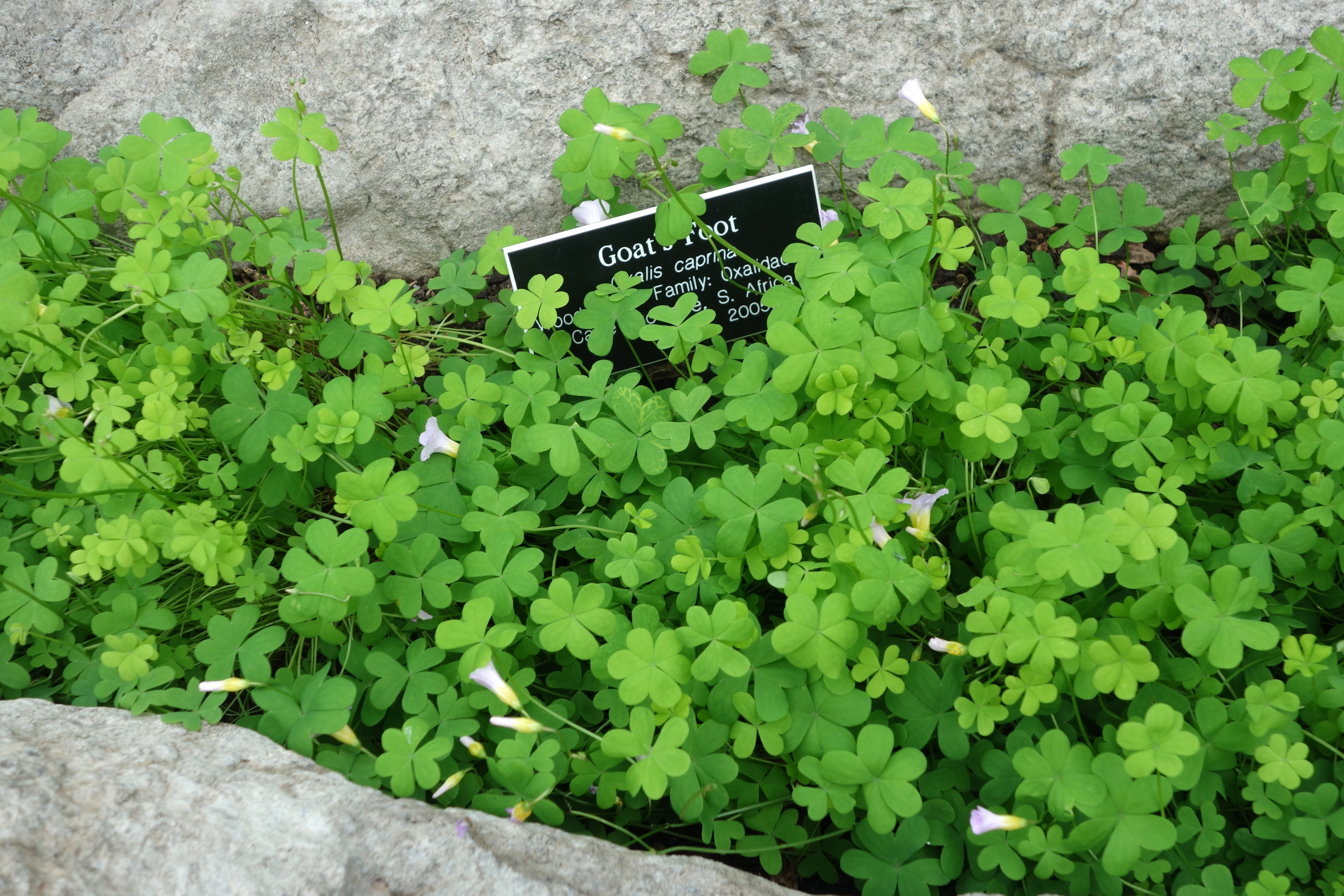

Scientific classification
- Kingdom: Plantae
- Clade: Tracheophytes
- Clade: Angiosperms
- Clade: Eudicots
- Clade: Rosids
- Order: Oxalidales
- Family: Oxalidaceae
- Genus: Oxalis
- Species: O. caprina

Binomial name
- Oxalis caprina Thunb.

= Oxalis caprina =

Species of flowering plant

Oxalis caprina (Goat's foot) is a short-stemmed South African plant with bluish flowers from the genus Oxalis.
