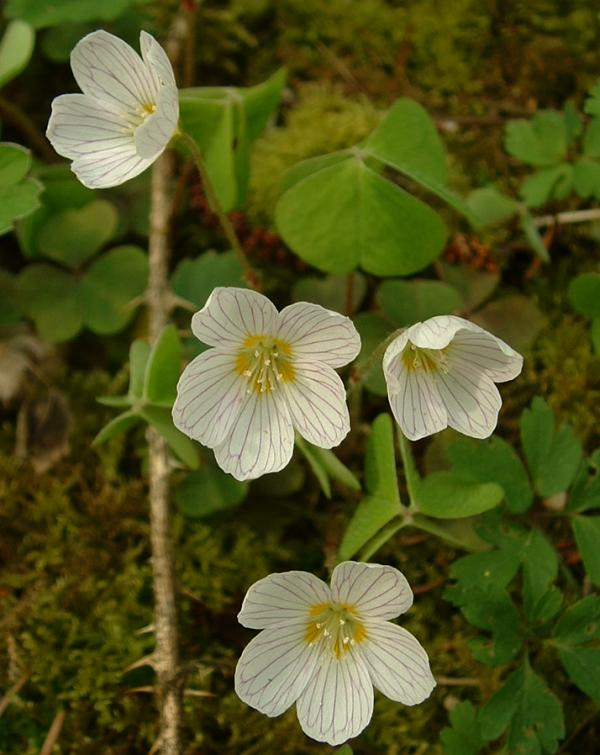
- Common wood-sorrel (Oxalis acetosella), the type species of the genus

Scientific classification
- Kingdom: Plantae
- Clade: Tracheophytes
- Clade: Angiosperms
- Clade: Eudicots
- Clade: Rosids
- Order: Oxalidales
- Family: Oxalidaceae
- Genus: Oxalis; L.

Species
- About 550, see List of Oxalis species

= Oxalis =

Genus of flowering plants

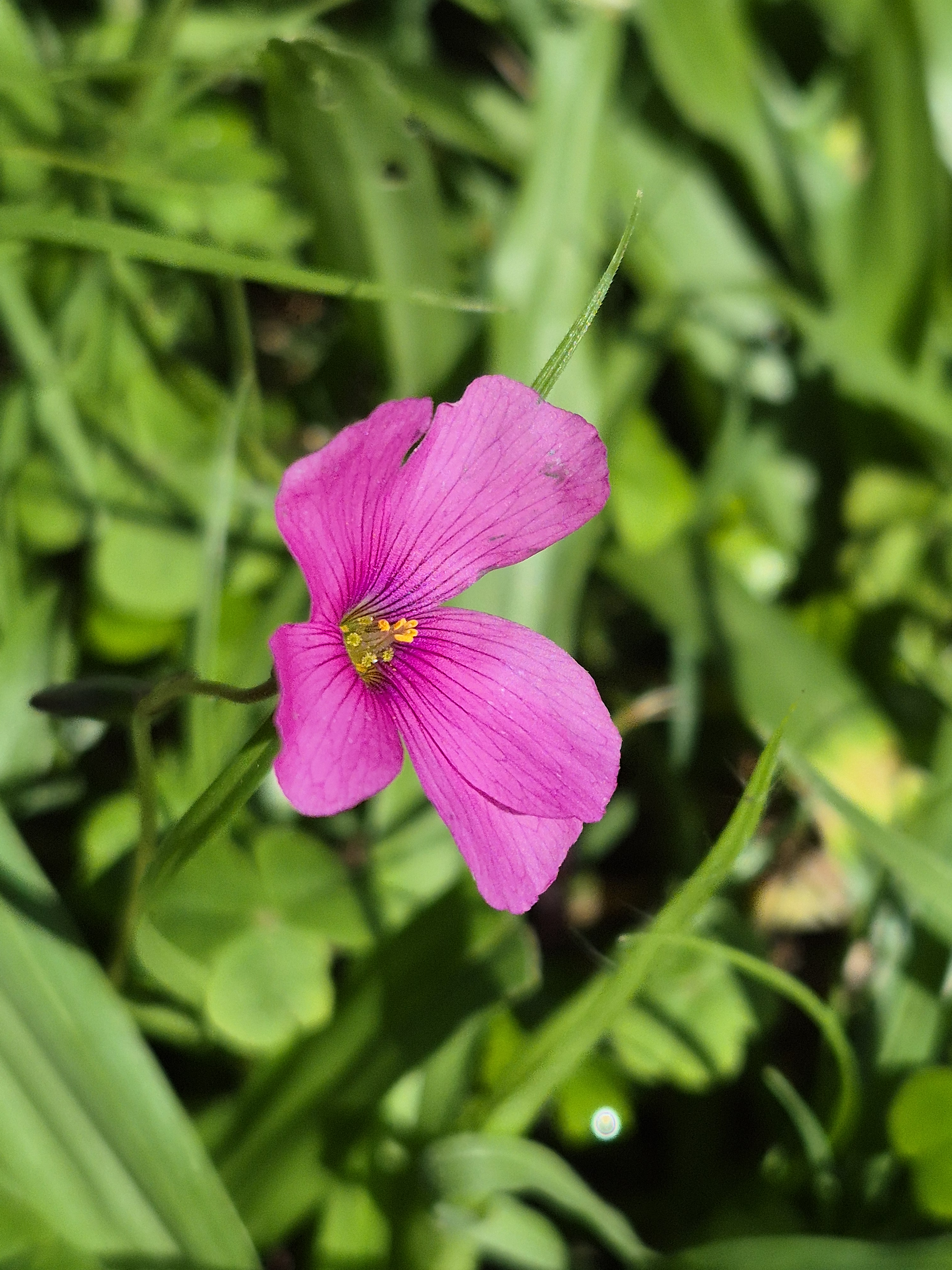
Oxalis sp. (possibly Oxalis hispidula)

Oxalis (UK: /ɒksɑːlɪs/ ok-SAH-liss, US: /ˈɒksəlɪs/ OK-sə-liss) is a large genus of flowering plants in the wood-sorrel family, Oxalidaceae, comprising over 550 species. The genus occurs throughout most of the world, except for the polar areas; species diversity is particularly rich in tropical Brazil, Mexico, and South Africa.

Many of the species are known as wood-sorrels (also as wood sorrels or woodsorrels) as they have an acidic taste reminiscent of the sorrel proper (Rumex acetosa), which is not closely related. Some species are called yellow sorrels or pink sorrels after the colour of their flowers instead. Other species are colloquially known as false shamrocks, and some called sourgrasses. For the genus as a whole, the term oxalises is also used. Many plants in this genus contain oxalic acid; the acid being named after the genus Oxalis.

== Description ==
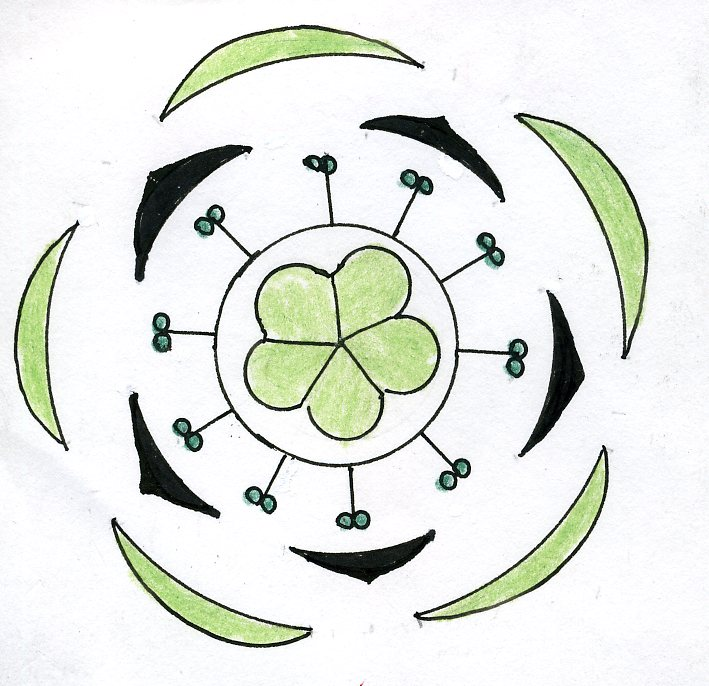
Floral diagram of Oxalis

The plants are annual or perennial. The leaves are divided into three to ten or more obovate and top-notched leaflets, arranged palmately with all the leaflets of roughly equal size. The majority of species have three leaflets, superficially similar to those of some clovers. Some species exhibit rapid changes in leaf angle in response to temporarily high light intensity to decrease photoinhibition.

The flowers have five petals, which are usually fused at the base, and ten stamens. The petal colour varies from white to pink, red or yellow; anthocyanins and xanthophylls may be present or absent but are generally not both present together in significant quantities, meaning that few wood-sorrels have bright orange flowers. The fruit is a small capsule containing several seeds. The roots are often tuberous and succulent, and several species also reproduce vegetatively by production of bulbils, which detach to produce new plants.

== Taxonomy ==
Originally, the first taxonomic classification of the genus Oxalis was established by Linnaeus (1753), naming 14 species that were classified into two main unranked groups based on the presence or absence of a stem.

The most comprehensive taxonomic studies of the genus were conducted by Alicia Lourteig, who established a revision of Oxalis that greatly clarified its taxonomy. She proposed a new subgeneric and sectional classification for the genus, mainly based on characters of leaf morphology. Her work recognizes 250 south American species and the genus Oxalis was classified into four subgenera and 28 sections. Her four subgenera Oxalis, Thamnoxys (Endl.) Reiche emend. Lourteig, Monoxalis (Small) Lourteig, and Trifidus Lourteig are the most commonly used classification of the genus.

Subgenus Oxalis encompasses a broad assemblage of species characterized by substantial morphological and ecological heterogeneity. Most species within the genus Oxalis have been placed within this subgenus, which has 18 recognized sections across approximately 412 species. This subgenus is characterized by palmate leaves, but morphological characters vary among sections. For example, the sect Articulatae, comprising five species, is distinguished by vertically enlarged xylopodium, obcordate leaflets, and sepals with calli; Articulatatae is morphologically related to sect. Alpinae by the basis of these characters. However, sect. Ionoxalis is differentiated by a bracteated bulb and reduced stem consistent with a basal disc despite also having obcordate leaves. Considering the substantial number of species within the subgenus Oxalis, as well as their widespread global distribution, the presence of morphological heterogeneity is likely the outcome of adaptive radiation.

Subgenus Thamnoxys is distinguished by its often-woody habit and more restricted distribution. There are nine sections across approximately 71 species. Members are shrubby species with pinnately compound leaves that often have distinct (1-3 foliolate) leaflet arrangements. Additional often present shared morphological characteristics include visible leaftlet raquis, bilobed and capitated stigmas, and transversely striated seeds. Many members are shrubs or sub-shrubs, although not all.

Subgenus Monoxalis includes herbaceous taxa with relatively simple morphology. The two species present in the subgenus are characterized as having simple, unifoliate leaves and linguiform stamens. Monoxalis contains the species O. dichondraefolia and O. robusta.

Subgenus Trifidus is defined by characteristic trifid, or three-parted, leaf morphology, although other features are unique among the members of this subgenus. Trifidus contains the two species O. sleumeri and O. tacorensis.

== Ecology ==
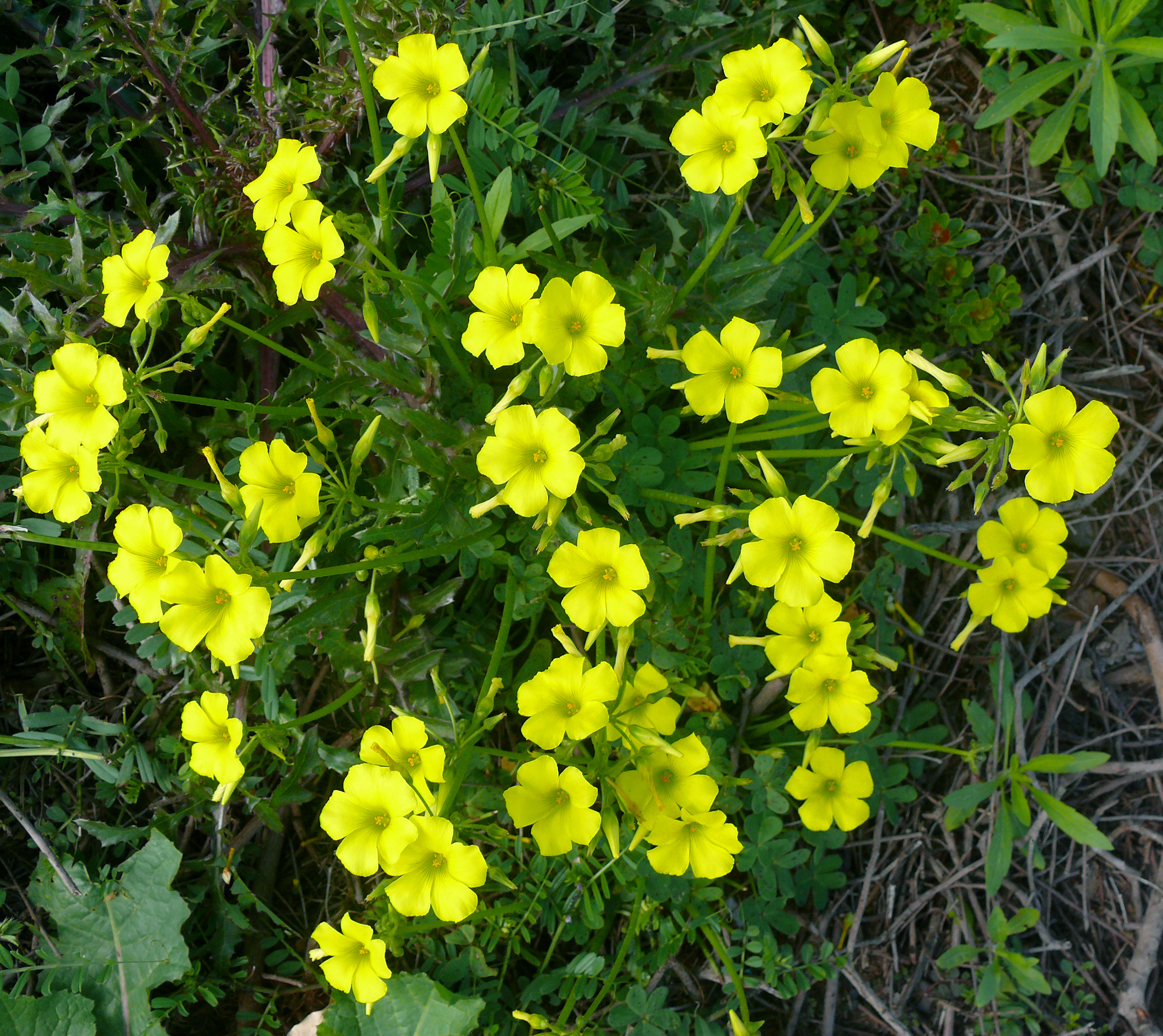
Oxalis pes-caprae

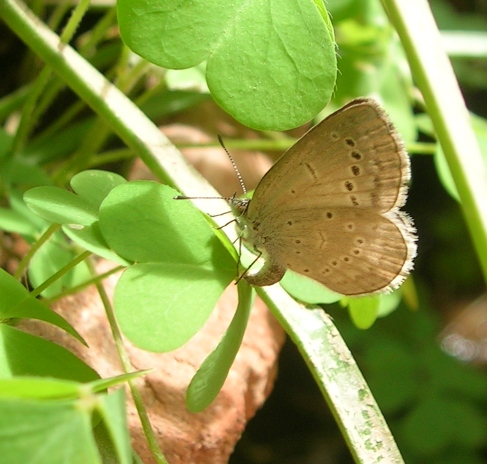
Pale grass blue (Pseudozizeeria maha) of the dry-season brood laying eggs on Oxalis

Several Oxalis species dominate the plant life in local woodland ecosystems, be it Coast Range ecoregion of the North American Pacific Northwest, or the Sydney Turpentine-Ironbark Forest in southeastern Australia where least yellow sorrel (O. exilis) is common. In the United Kingdom and neighboring Europe, common wood sorrel (O. acetosella) is the typical woodland member of this genus, forming large swaths in the typical mixed deciduous forests dominated by downy birch (Betula pubescens) and sessile oak (Quercus petraea), by sycamore maple (Acer pseudoplatanus), common bracken (Pteridium aquilinum), pedunculate oak (Q. robur) and blackberries (Rubus fruticosus agg.), or by common ash (Fraxinus excelsior), dog's mercury (Mercurialis perennis) and European rowan (Sorbus aucuparia); it is also common in woods of common juniper (Juniperus communis ssp. communis). Some species – notably Bermuda-buttercup (O. pes-caprae) and creeping woodsorrel (O. corniculata) – are pernicious, invasive weeds when escaping from cultivation outside their native ranges; the ability of most wood-sorrels to store reserve energy in their tubers makes them quite resistant to most weed control techniques.

A 2019 study suggested that species from this genus have a symbiotic relationship with nitrogen fixing Bacillus endophytes, storing them in plant tissues and seeds, which could explain its ability to spread rapidly even in poor soils.

Tuberous woodsorrels provide food for certain small herbivores, such as the Montezuma quail (Cyrtonyx montezumae). The foliage is eaten by some Lepidoptera, such as the Polyommatini pale grass blue (Pseudozizeeria maha), which feeds on creeping wood sorrel and others, and dark grass blue (Zizeeria lysimon).

Oxalis species are susceptible to the rust fungus (Puccinia oxalidis).

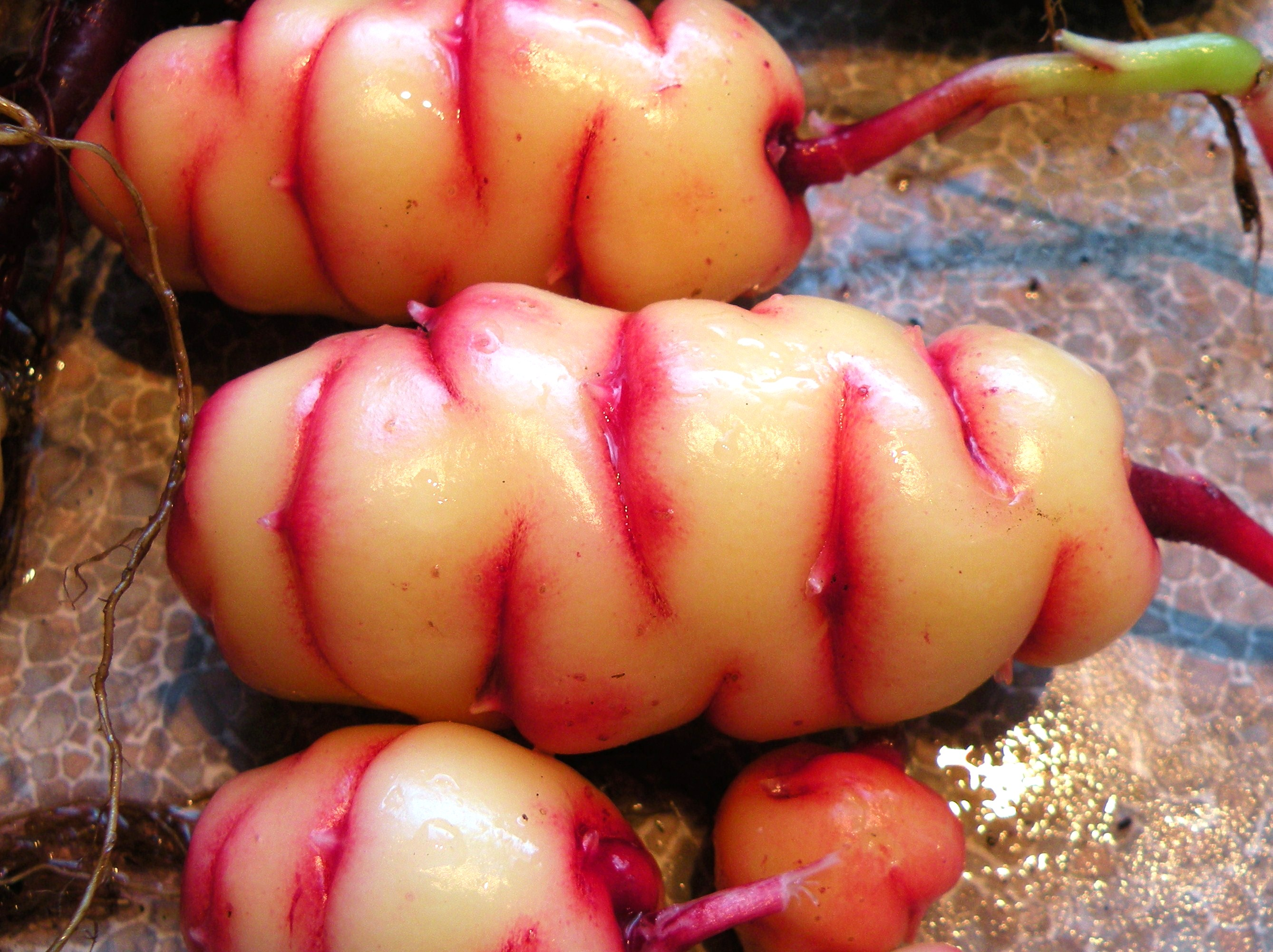
Tubers of oca (Oxalis tuberosa) for eating

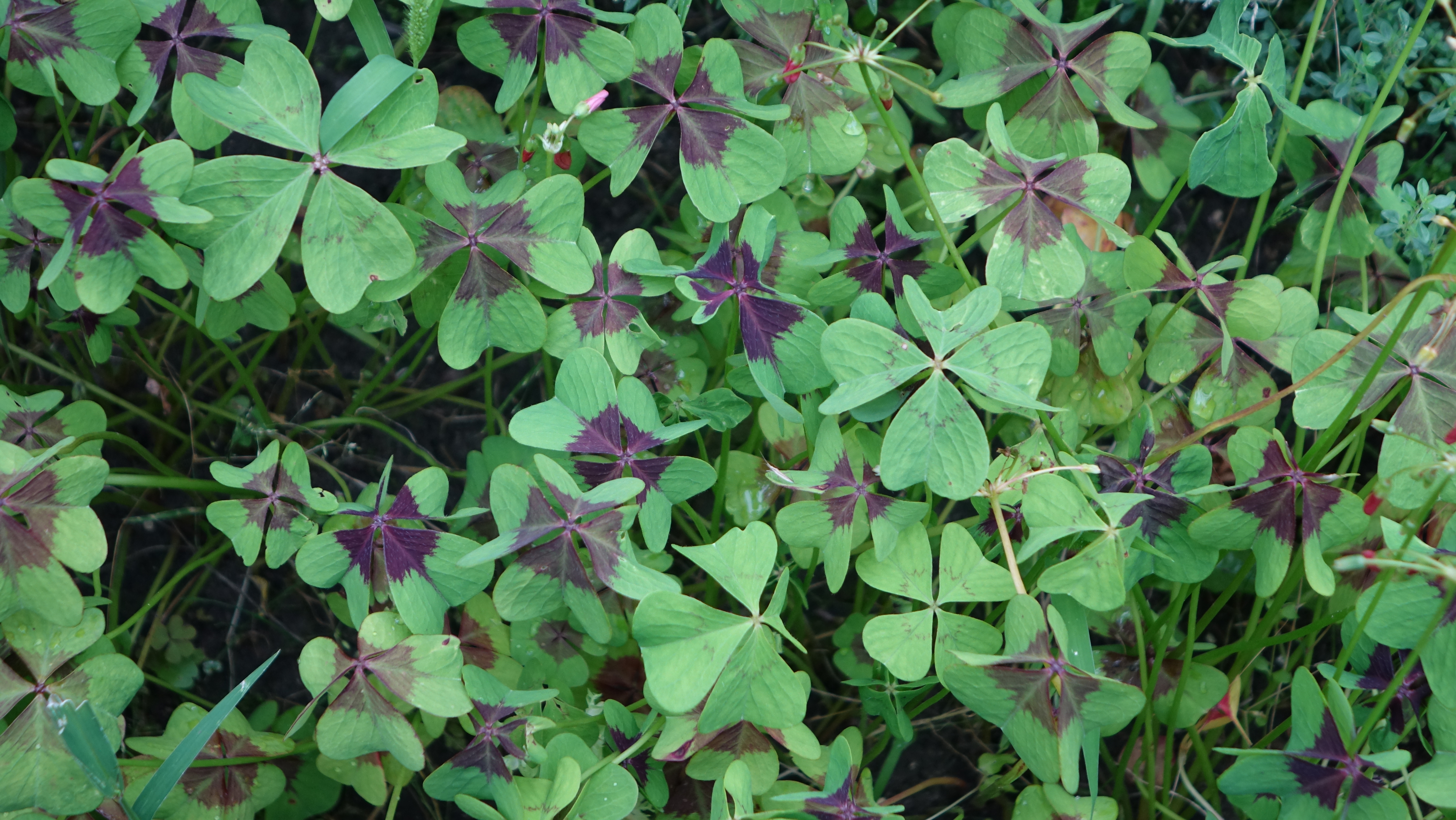
Four-leaved pink-sorrel (Oxalis tetraphylla)

== Uses ==
=== As food ===
Several species of Oxalis are edible wild plants that have been consumed by humans around the world for millennia. In Dr. James Duke's Handbook of Edible Weeds, he notes that the Native American Kiowa people chewed wood sorrel to alleviate thirst on long trips, the Potawatomi cooked it with sugar to make a dessert, the Algonquin considered it an aphrodisiac, the Cherokee ate wood sorrel to alleviate mouth sores and a sore throat, and the Iroquois ate wood sorrel to help with cramps, fever and nausea.

The fleshy, juicy edible tubers of the oca (O. tuberosa) have long been cultivated for food in Colombia and elsewhere in the northern Andes Mountains of South America. It is grown and sold in New Zealand as "New Zealand yam" (although not a true yam), and varieties are now available in yellow, orange, apricot, and pink, as well as the traditional red-orange.

The leaves of scurvy-grass sorrel (O. enneaphylla) were eaten by sailors travelling around Patagonia as a source of vitamin C to avoid scurvy.

In India, creeping wood sorrel (O. corniculata) is eaten only seasonally, starting in December–January. The Bodos of north east India sometimes prepare a sour fish curry with its leaves. The leaves of common wood-sorrel (O. acetosella) may be used to make a lemony-tasting tea when dried.

=== Other uses ===
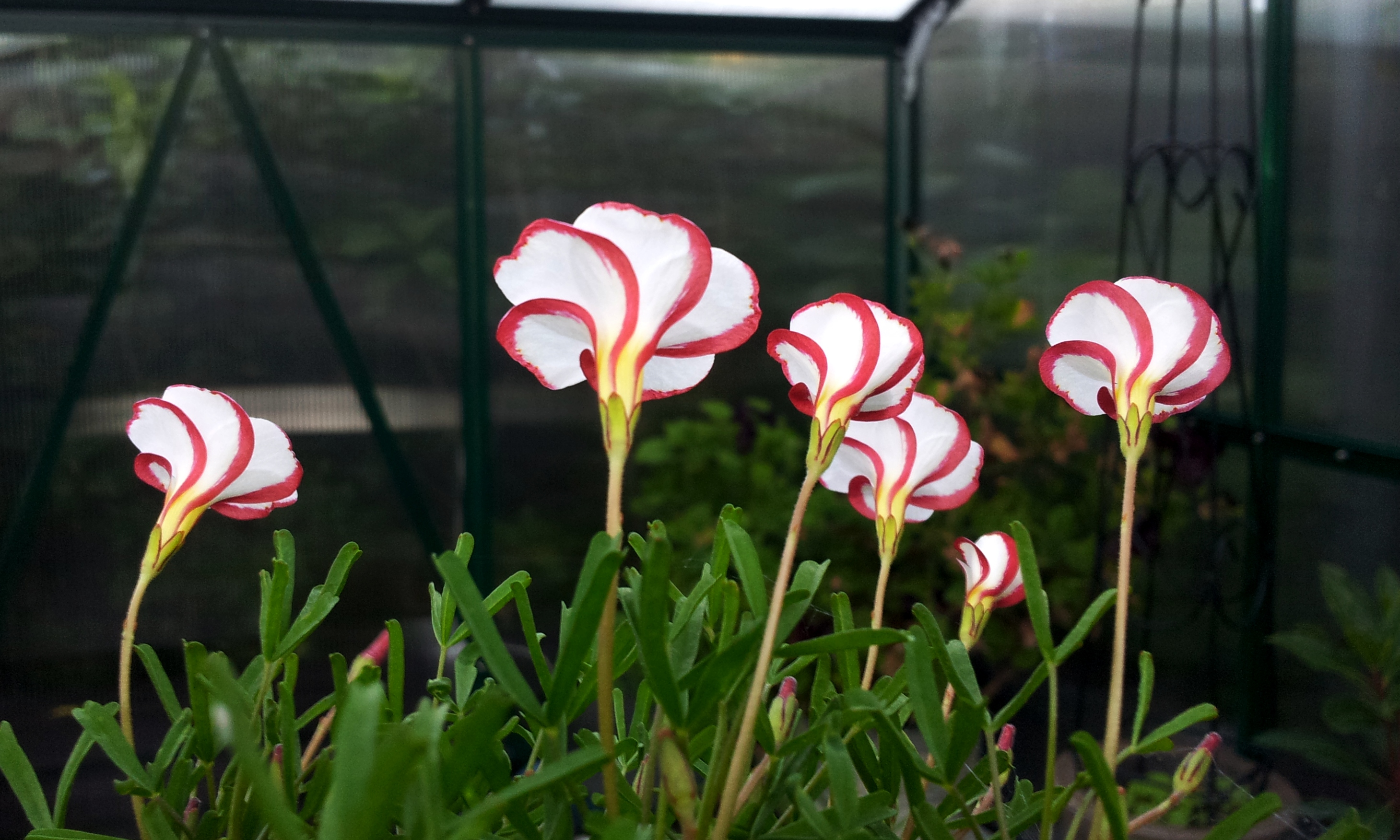
Oxalis versicolor (candycane sorrel) grown in New Zealand

In the past, it was a practice to extract crystals of calcium oxalate for use in treating diseases and as a salt called sal acetosella or "sorrel salt" (also known as "salt of lemon"). Growing oca tuber root caps are covered in a fluorescent slush rich in harmaline and harmine which apparently suppresses pests.

== As ornamental plants ==
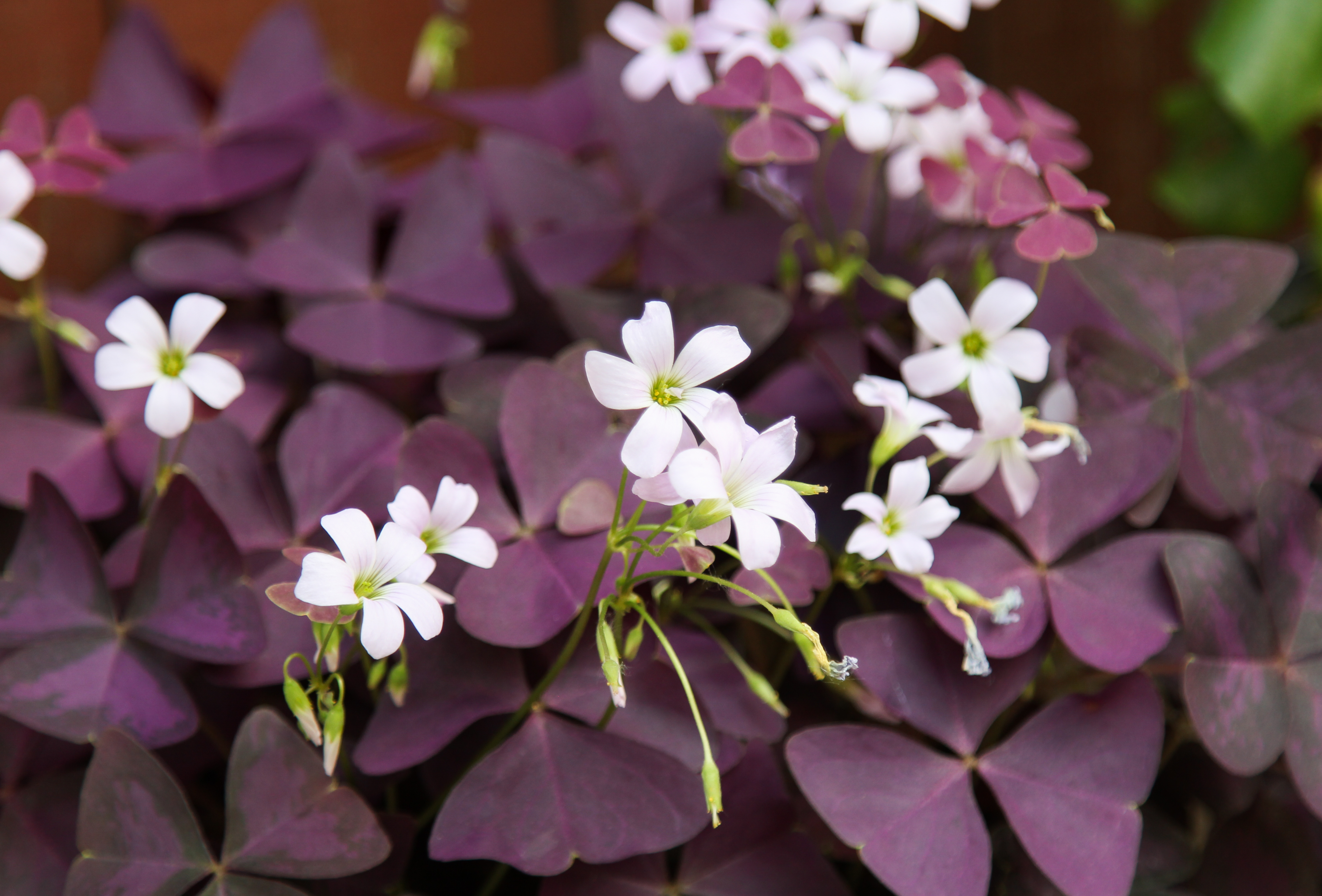
Oxalis triangularis

Several species are grown as pot plants or as ornamental plants in gardens, for example, O. versicolor.

Oxalis flowers range in colour from whites to yellow, peaches, pink, or multi-coloured flowers.

Some varieties have double flowers, for example the double form of O. compressus. Some varieties are grown for their foliage, such as the dark purple-leaved O. triangularis.

Species with four regular leaflets, in particular O. tetraphylla (four-leaved pink-sorrel), are sometimes misleadingly sold as "four-leaf clover", taking advantage of the mystical status of four-leaf clover.

== Selected species ==
- Oxalis acetosella – common wood-sorrel
- Oxalis adenophylla – Chilean oxalis, silver shamrock
- Oxalis albicans – hairy woodsorrel, white oxalis, radishroot woodsorrel, radishroot yellow-sorrel, California yellow-sorrel
- Oxalis alpina – alpine sorrel
- Oxalis ambigua
- Oxalis articulata Savign. – pink-sorrel
- Oxalis ausensis
- Oxalis barrelieri – lavender sorrel
- Oxalis bowiei – Bowie's wood-sorrel, Cape shamrock
- Oxalis brasiliensis – Brazilian woodsorrel
- Oxalis caerulea – blue woodsorrel
- Oxalis caprina
- Oxalis corniculata – creeping wood sorrel, procumbent yellow-sorrel, sleeping beauty, chichoda bhaji (India)
- Oxalis debilis Kunth
- Oxalis decaphylla – ten-leaved pink-sorrel, tenleaf wood sorrel
- Oxalis dehradunensis
- Oxalis depressa
- Oxalis dichondrifolia – peonyleaf wood sorrel
- Oxalis dillenii Jacquin – southern yellow woodsorrel, Dillen's woodsorrel, Sussex yellow-sorrel
- Oxalis drummondii – Drummond's woodsorrel, chevron oxalis
- Oxalis ecuadorensis
- Oxalis enneaphylla – scurvy-grass sorrel
- Oxalis exilis – least yellow-sorrel
- Oxalis frutescens – shrubby wood-sorrel
- Oxalis gigantea
- Oxalis glabra – finger-leaf
- Oxalis grandis – great yellow-sorrel, large yellow woodsorrel
- Oxalis griffithii Edgew. & Hook.f.
- Oxalis hedysaroides – fire fern
- Oxalis hirta – hairy sorrel
- Oxalis illinoensis – Illinois wood-sorrel
- Oxalis inaequalis
- Oxalis incarnata L. – pale pink-sorrel
- Oxalis lasiandra – Mexican shamrock
- Oxalis latifolia Kunth – garden pink-sorrel
- Oxalis luederitzii
- Oxalis luteola Jacq.
- Oxalis magellanica G.Forst.
- Oxalis magnifica Kunth – snowdrop wood-sorrel
- Oxalis massoniana
- Oxalis megalorrhiza – fleshy yellow-sorrel
- Oxalis melanosticta
- Oxalis montana – mountain woodsorrel, white woodsorrel
- Oxalis nelsonii – Nelson's sorrel
- Oxalis norlindiana
- Oxalis obliquifolia
- Oxalis oregana – redwood sorrel, Oregon sorrel
- Oxalis ortgiesii Regel – fishtail oxalis
- Oxalis pennelliana
- Oxalis pes-caprae – Bermuda-buttercup, African wood-sorrel, Bermuda sorrel, buttercup oxalis, Cape sorrel, English weed, soursob, "goat's-foot", "sourgrass", soursop (not to be confused with the fruit of that name)
- Oxalis priceae – tufted yellow-sorrel
- Oxalis pulchella
- Oxalis purpurea L. – purple wood-sorrel
- Oxalis rosea Feuillée ex Jacq. – annual pink-sorrel
- Oxalis rubra A.St.-Hil. – red wood-sorrel
- Oxalis rufescens
- Oxalis rugeliana – coamo
- Oxalis rusciformis
- Oxalis schaeferi
- Oxalis spiralis – spiral sorrel, volcanic sorrel, velvet oxalis
- Oxalis stricta – common yellow woodsorrel, common yellow oxalis, upright yellow-sorrel, lemon clover, "pickle plant", "sourgrass, "yellow woodsorrel"
- Oxalis suksdorfii – western yellow woodsorrel, western yellow oxalis
- Oxalis tenuifolia – thinleaf sorrel
- Oxalis tetraphylla – four-leaved pink-sorrel, four-leaf sorrel, Iron Cross oxalis, "lucky clover"
- Oxalis triangularis – threeleaf purple shamrock
- Oxalis trilliifolia – great oxalis, threeleaf woodsorrel
- Oxalis tuberosa – oca, oka, New Zealand yam
- Oxalis valdiviensis – Chilean yellow-sorrel
- Oxalis virginea – virgin wood-sorrel
- Oxalis versicolor – candycane sorrel
- Oxalis violacea – violet wood-sorrel
- Oxalis vulcanicola – volcanic sorrel or velvet oxalis
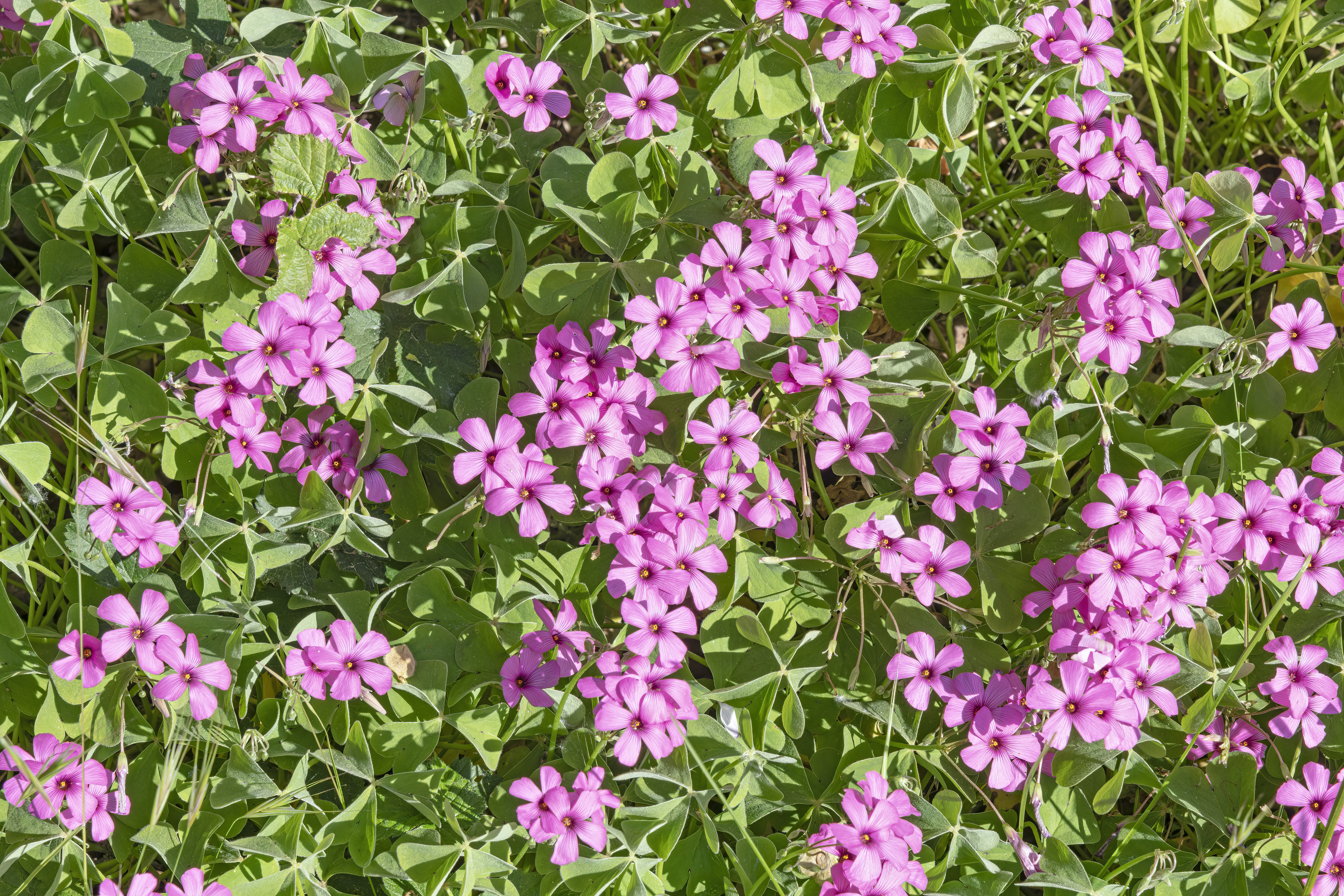
Oxalis articulata Savign. subsp. rubra (A.St.-Hil.)

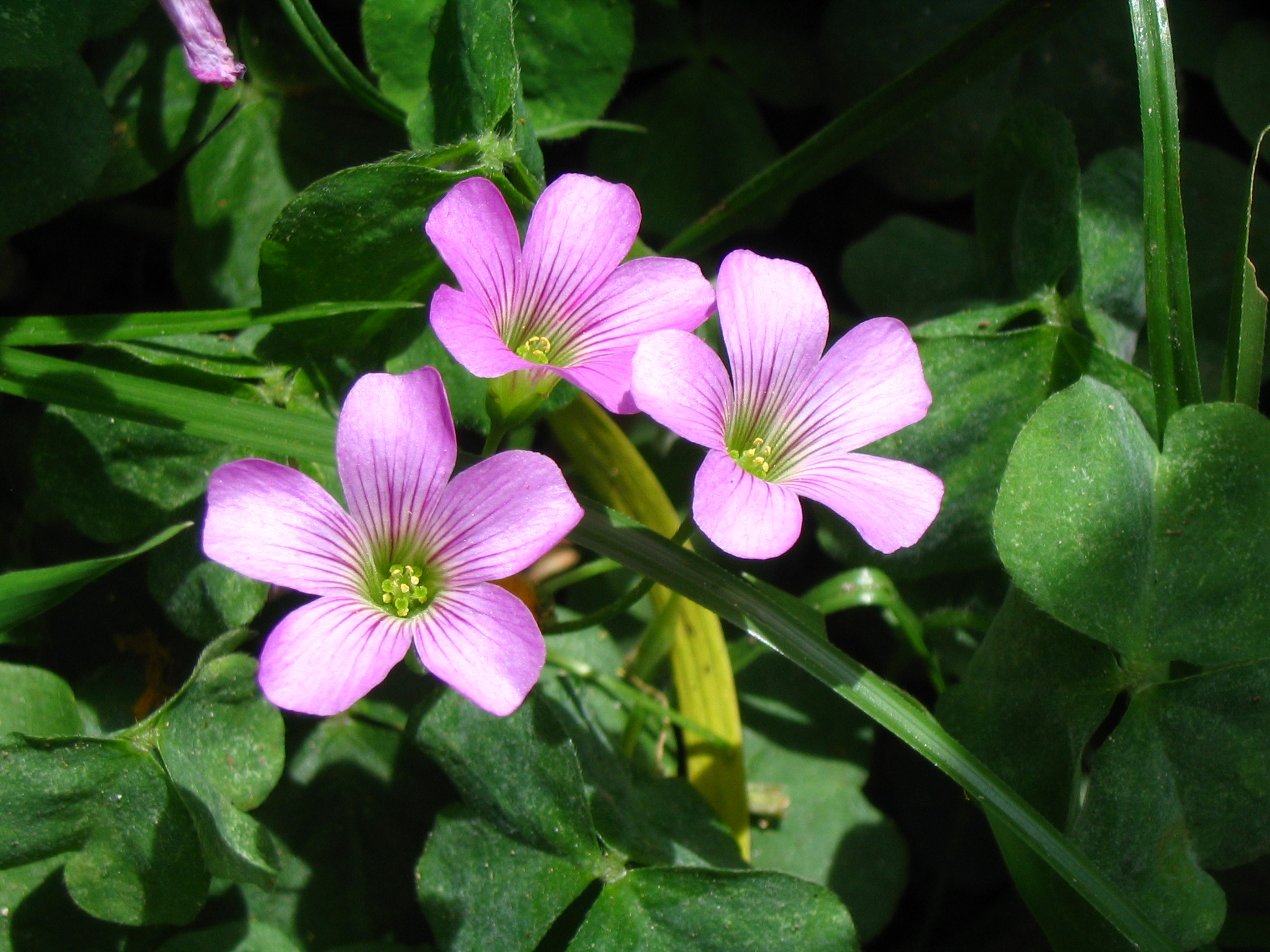
Oxalis debilis Kunth (syn. O. corymbosa)

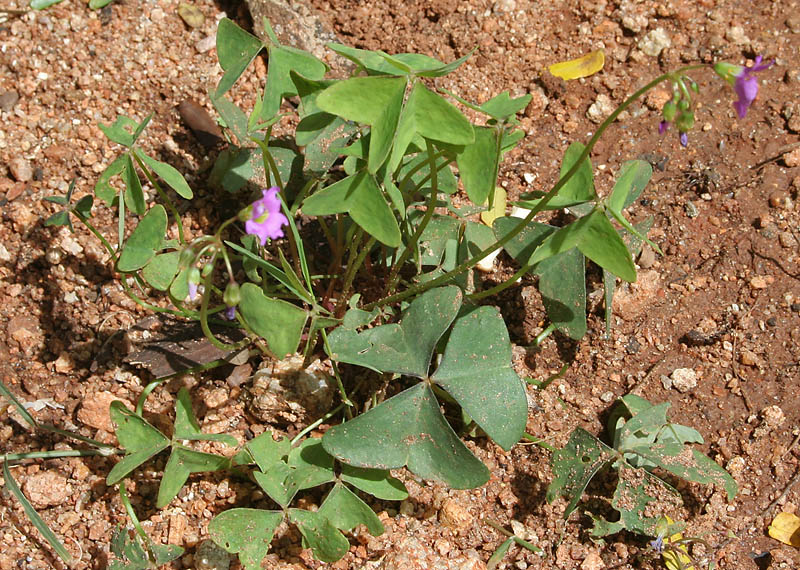
Oxalis dehradunensis Raizada, 1976

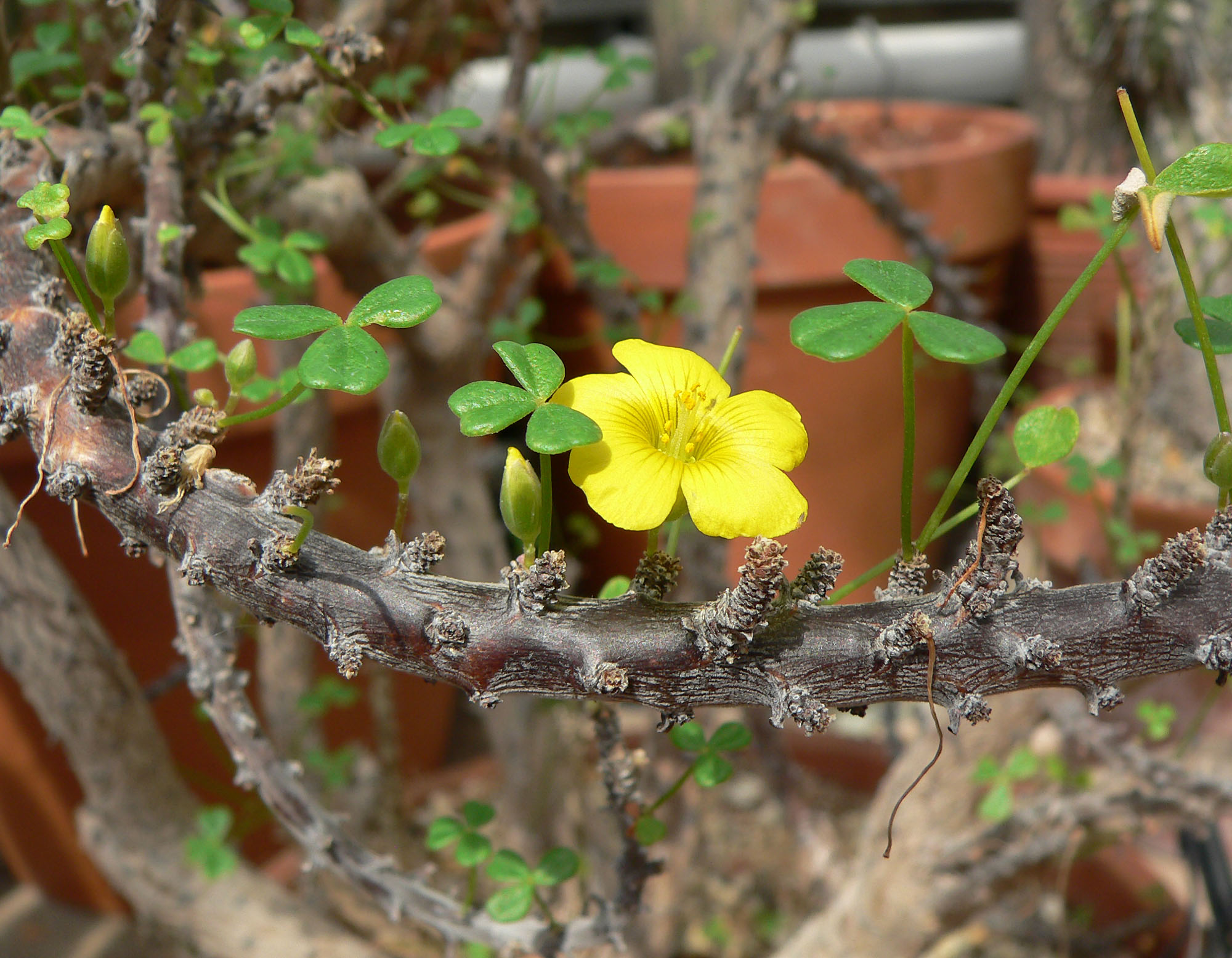
Oxalis gigantea Barneoud, 1846

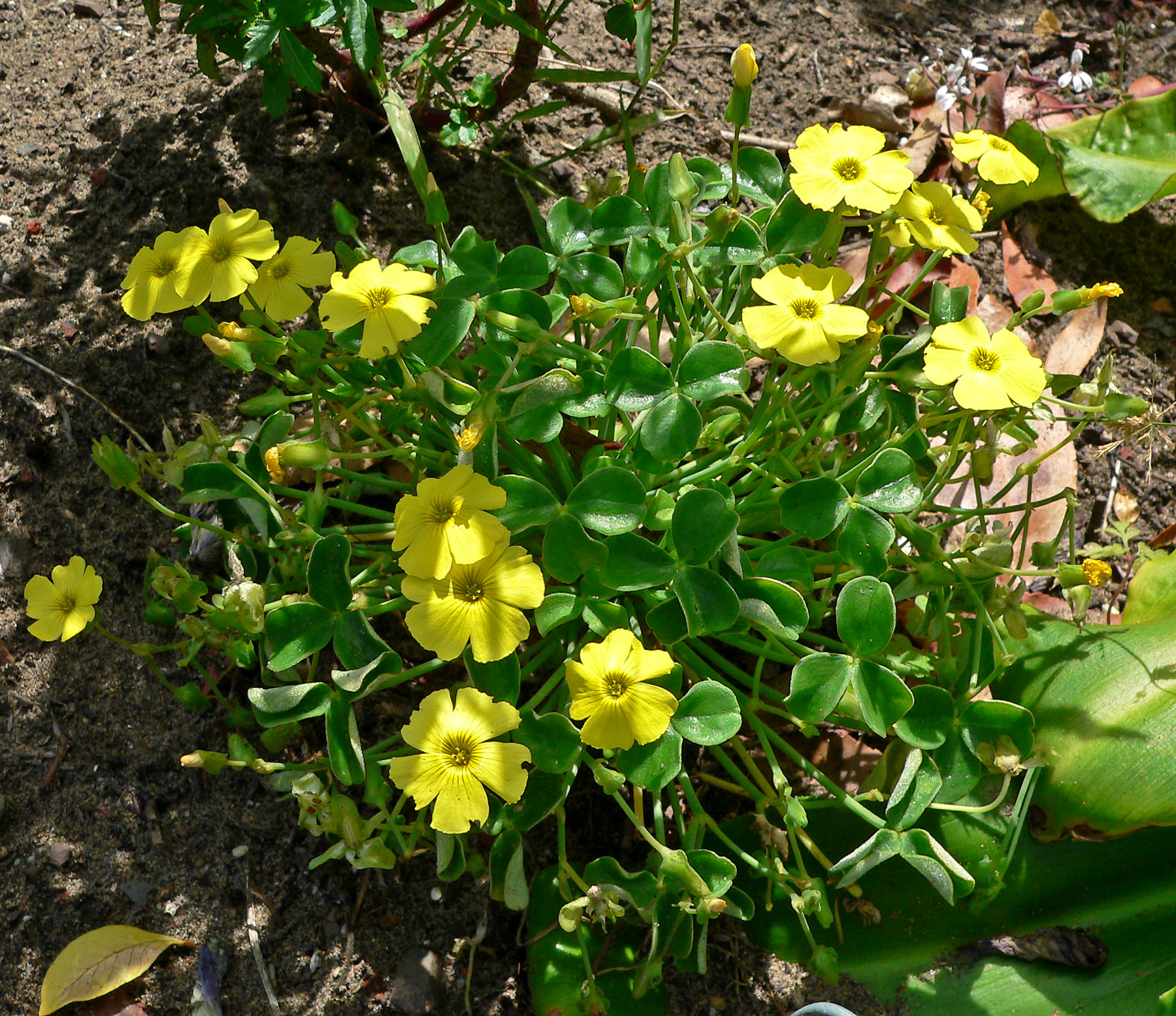
Oxalis luteola

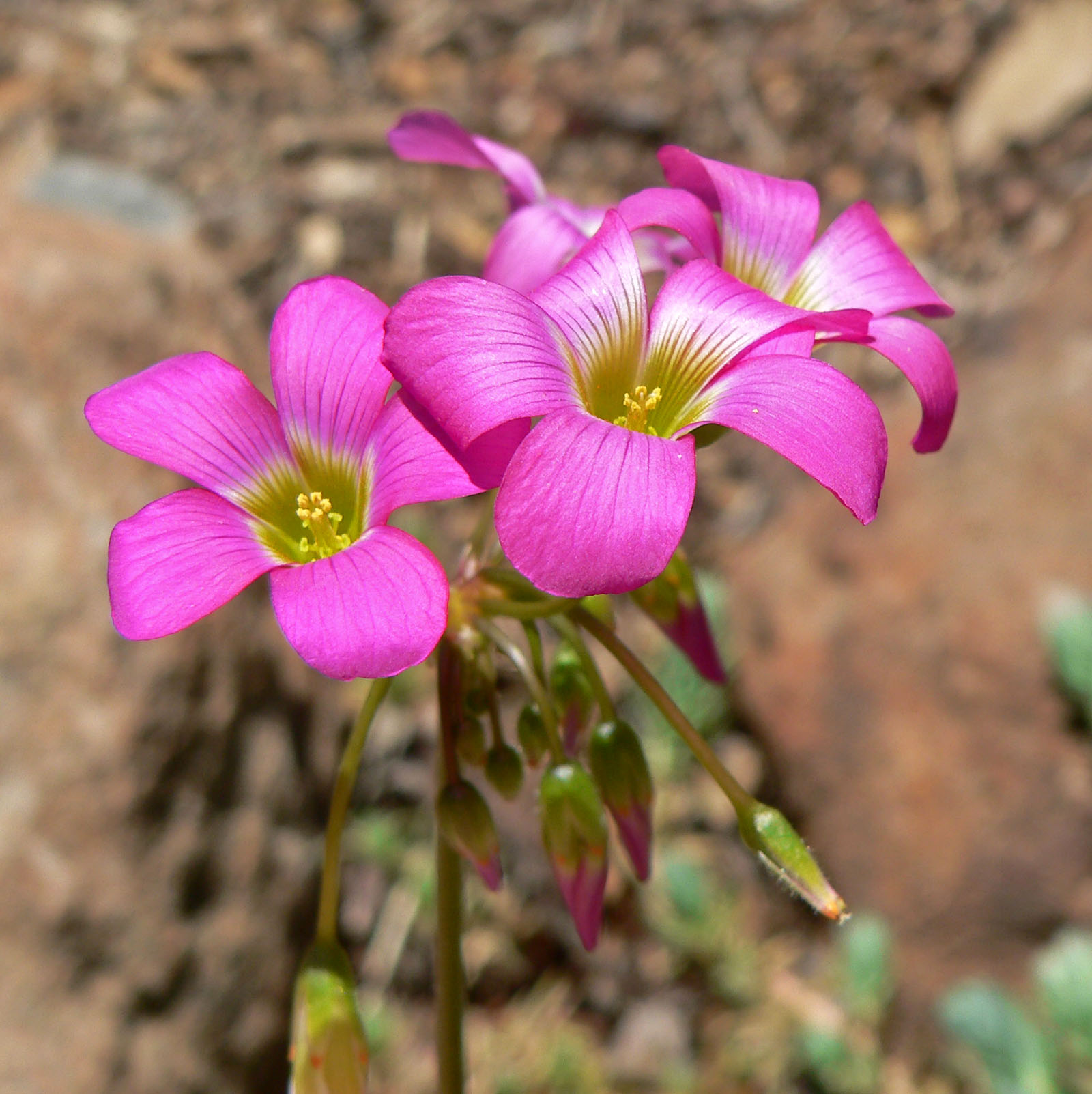
Oxalis magnifica R.Knuth, 1919

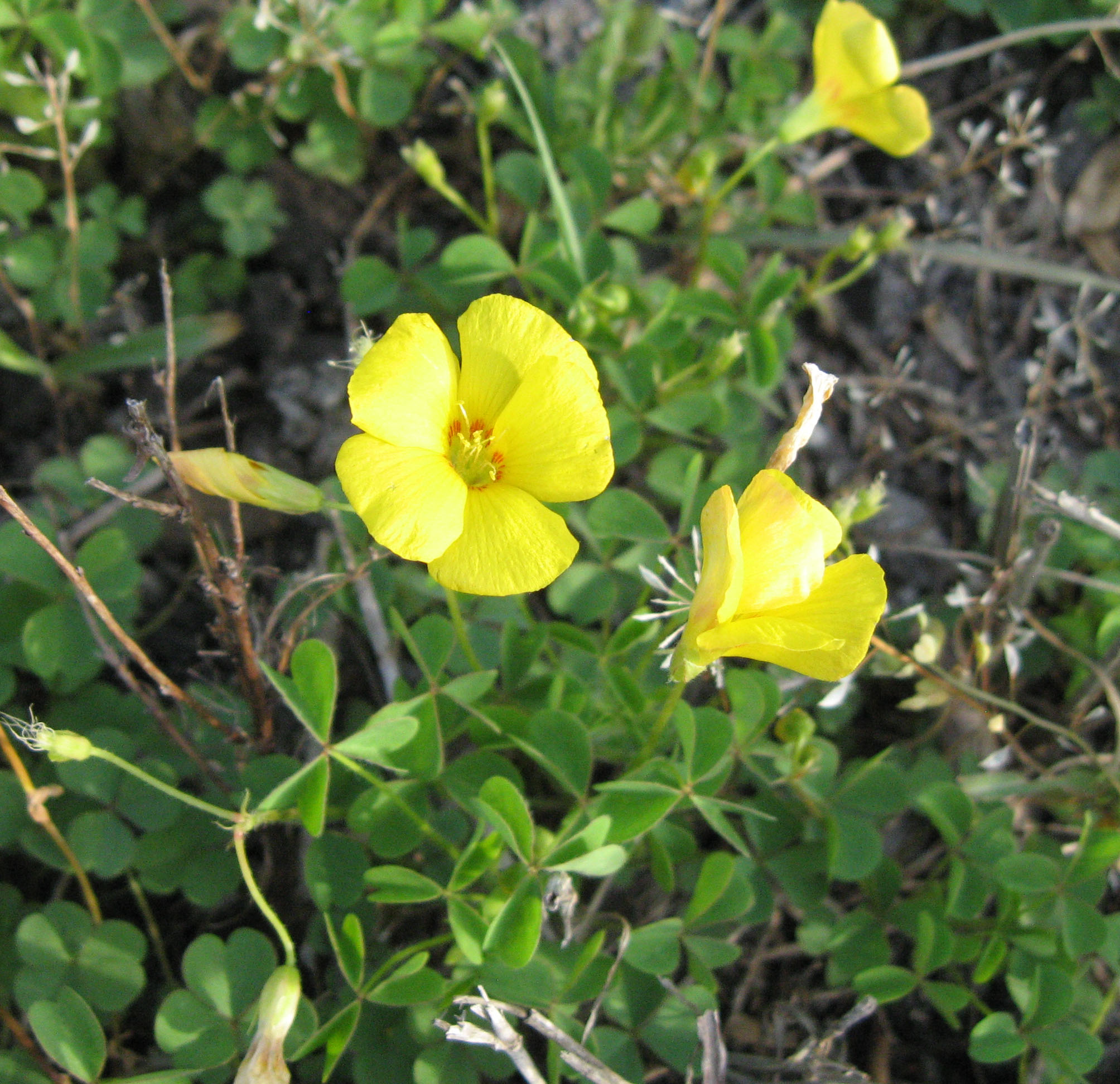
Oxalis priceae Small

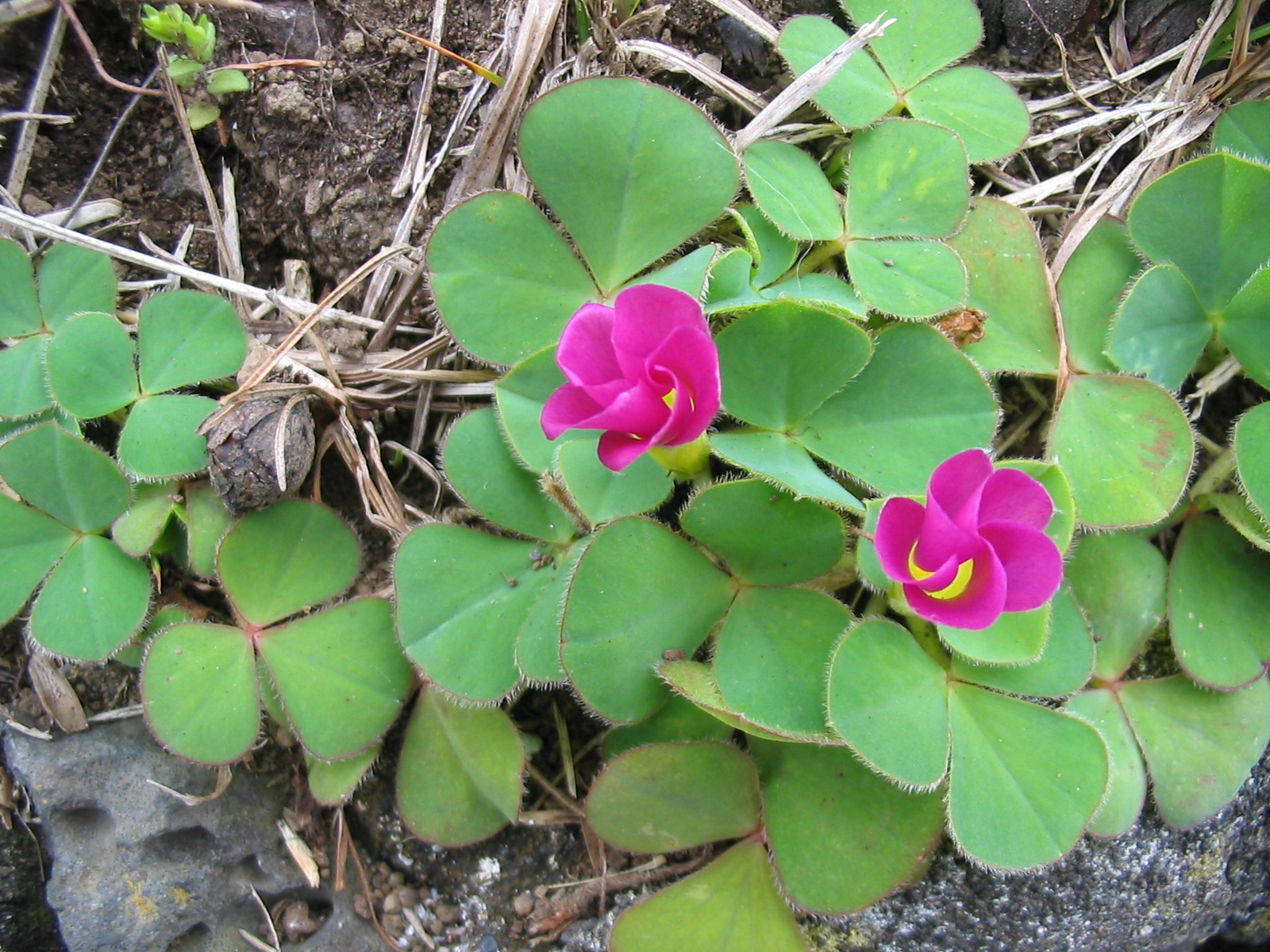
Oxalis purpurea L., 1753
