= Oxalis rufescens =

Conservation status
- Vulnerable (IUCN 3.1)

Scientific classification
- Kingdom: Plantae
- Clade: Tracheophytes
- Clade: Angiosperms
- Clade: Eudicots
- Clade: Rosids
- Order: Oxalidales
- Family: Oxalidaceae
- Genus: Oxalis
- Species: O. rufescens

Binomial name
- Oxalis rufescens Turcz.

Species of flowering plant

Oxalis rufescens is a species of plant in the family Oxalidaceae. It is endemic to Ecuador.
