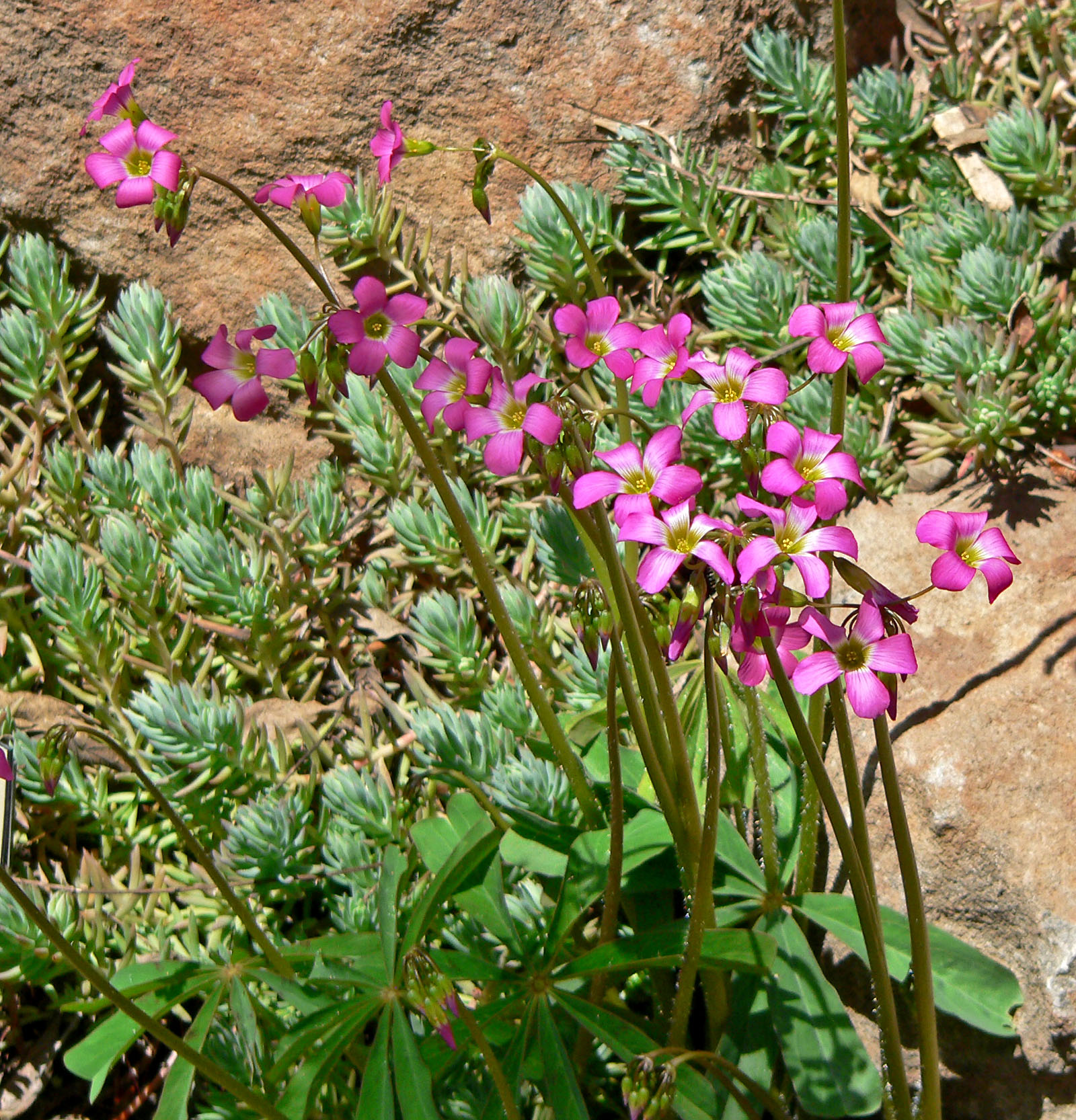

Scientific classification
- Kingdom: Plantae
- Clade: Tracheophytes
- Clade: Angiosperms
- Clade: Eudicots
- Clade: Rosids
- Order: Oxalidales
- Family: Oxalidaceae
- Genus: Oxalis
- Species: O. magnifica

Binomial name
- Oxalis magnifica (Rose) R. Knuth

Synonyms
- Ionoxalis magnifica Rose; Ionoxalis oaxacana Rose ex R. Knuth.

= Oxalis magnifica =

Species of flowering plant

Oxalis magnifica is an Oxalis species found in Oaxaca, Mexico, described in 1919.
