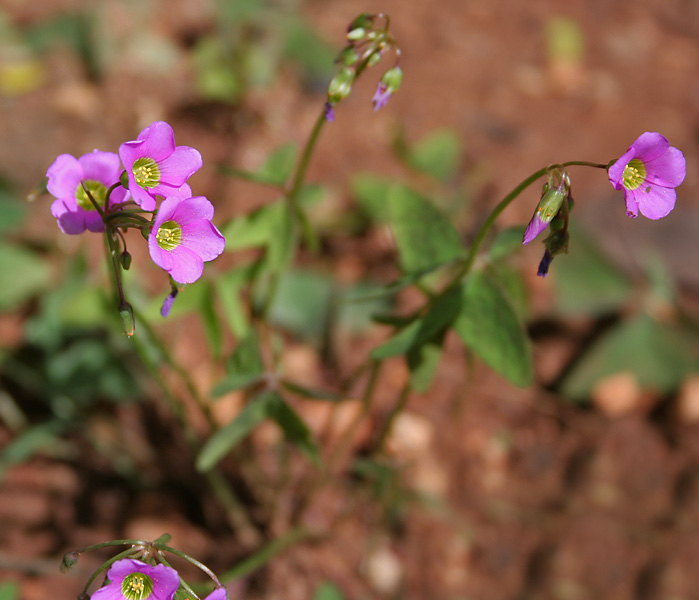

Scientific classification
- Kingdom: Plantae
- Clade: Tracheophytes
- Clade: Angiosperms
- Clade: Eudicots
- Clade: Rosids
- Order: Oxalidales
- Family: Oxalidaceae
- Genus: Oxalis
- Species: O. dehradunensis

Binomial name
- Oxalis dehradunensis Raizada

Synonyms
- Oxalis intermedia A.Rich

= Oxalis dehradunensis =

Species of flowering plant

Oxalis dehradunensis is a species of plant native to the Caribbean and Gulf Coast region. It is also found in India. It has a chromosome count of 2n=14.

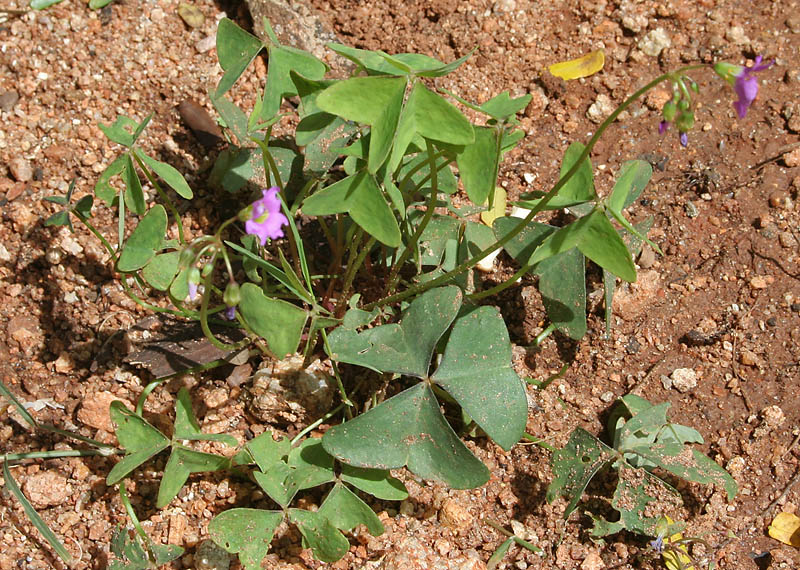
Oxalis dehradunensis growing in Hyderabad, India
