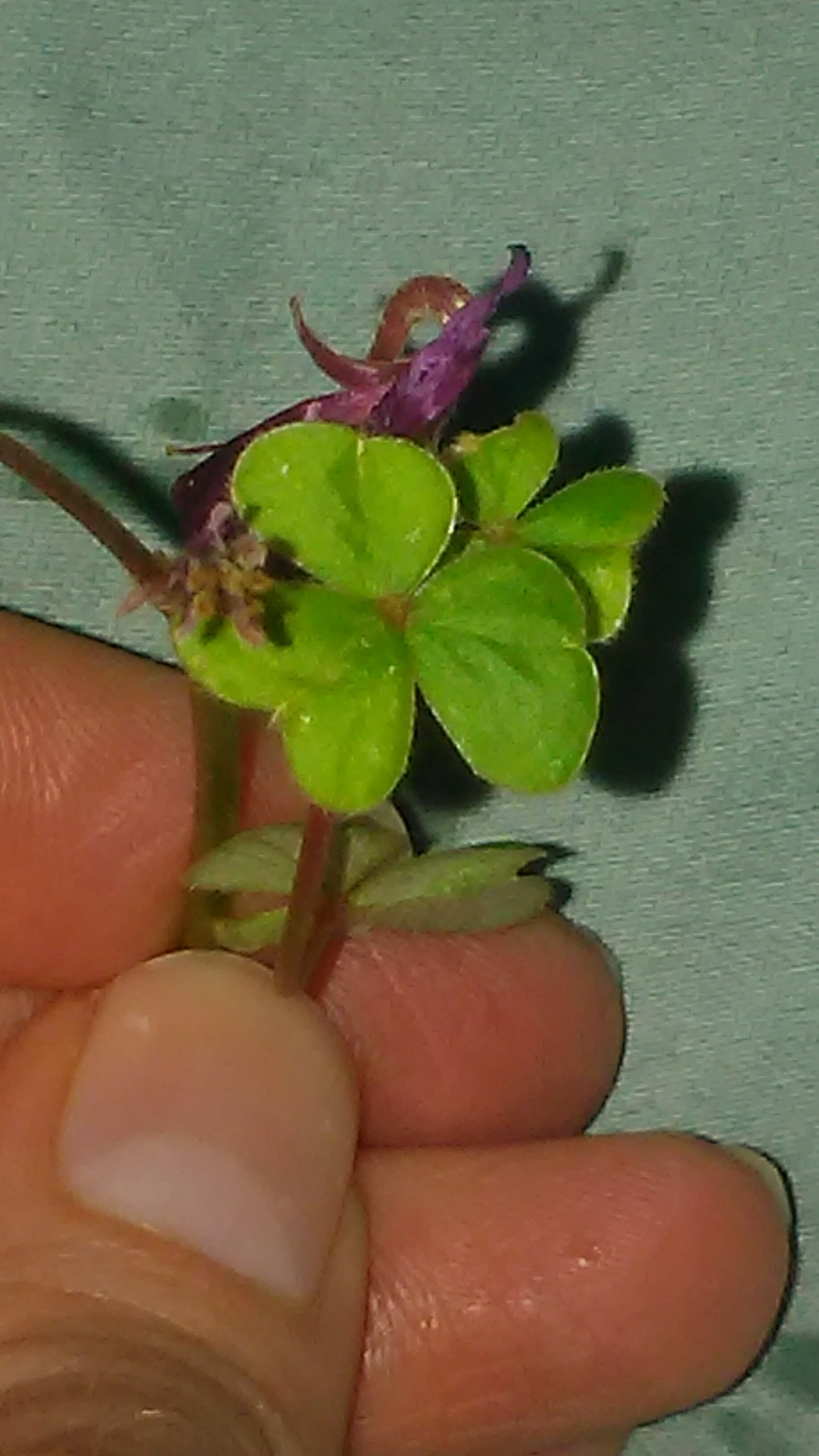

Scientific classification
- Kingdom: Plantae
- Clade: Tracheophytes
- Clade: Angiosperms
- Clade: Eudicots
- Clade: Rosids
- Order: Oxalidales
- Family: Oxalidaceae
- Genus: Oxalis
- Section: Oxalis sect. Ionoxalis
- Species: O. brasiliensis

Binomial name
- Oxalis brasiliensis Larrañaga

= Oxalis brasiliensis =

Species of flowering plant

Oxalis brasiliensis, also known by its common name Brazilian woodsorrel is a species from the section Ionoxalis. It was first described by Dámaso Antonio Larrañaga.

== Description ==
Oxalis brasiliensis is a herbaceous, perennial plant with a very long but simple root and very small stems. It has yellow or brilliant crimson-purple flowers.

== Gallery ==
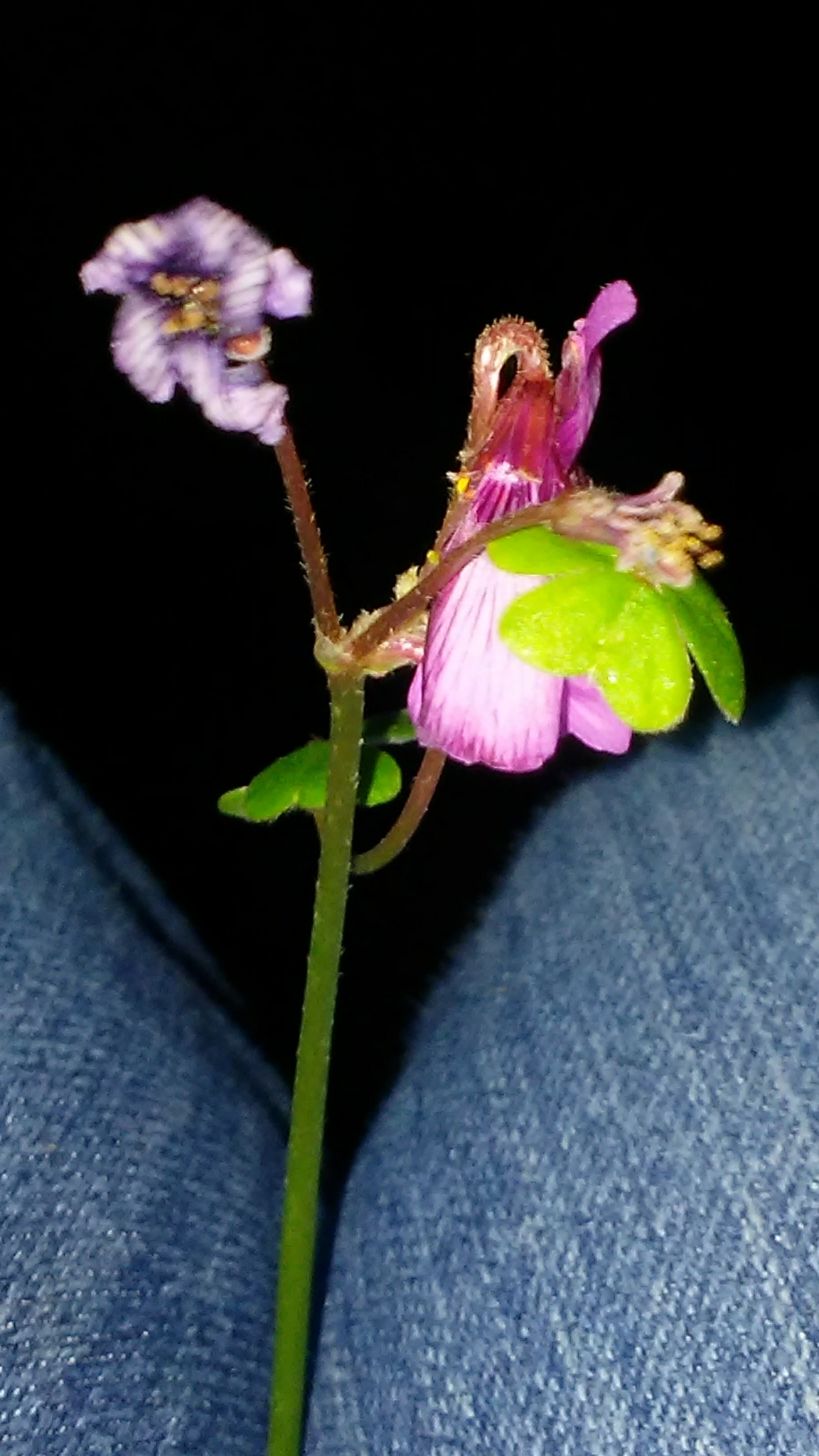

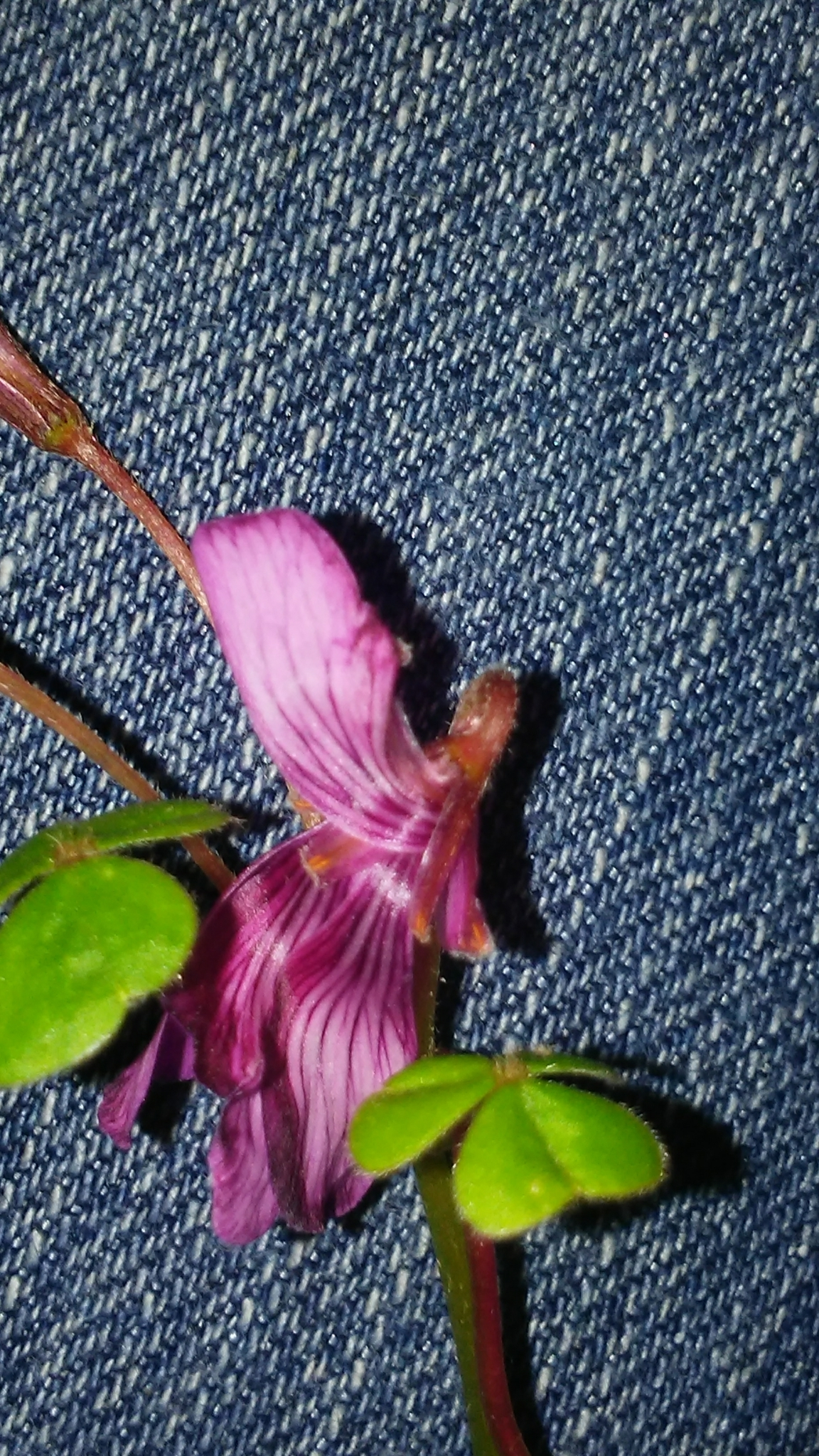

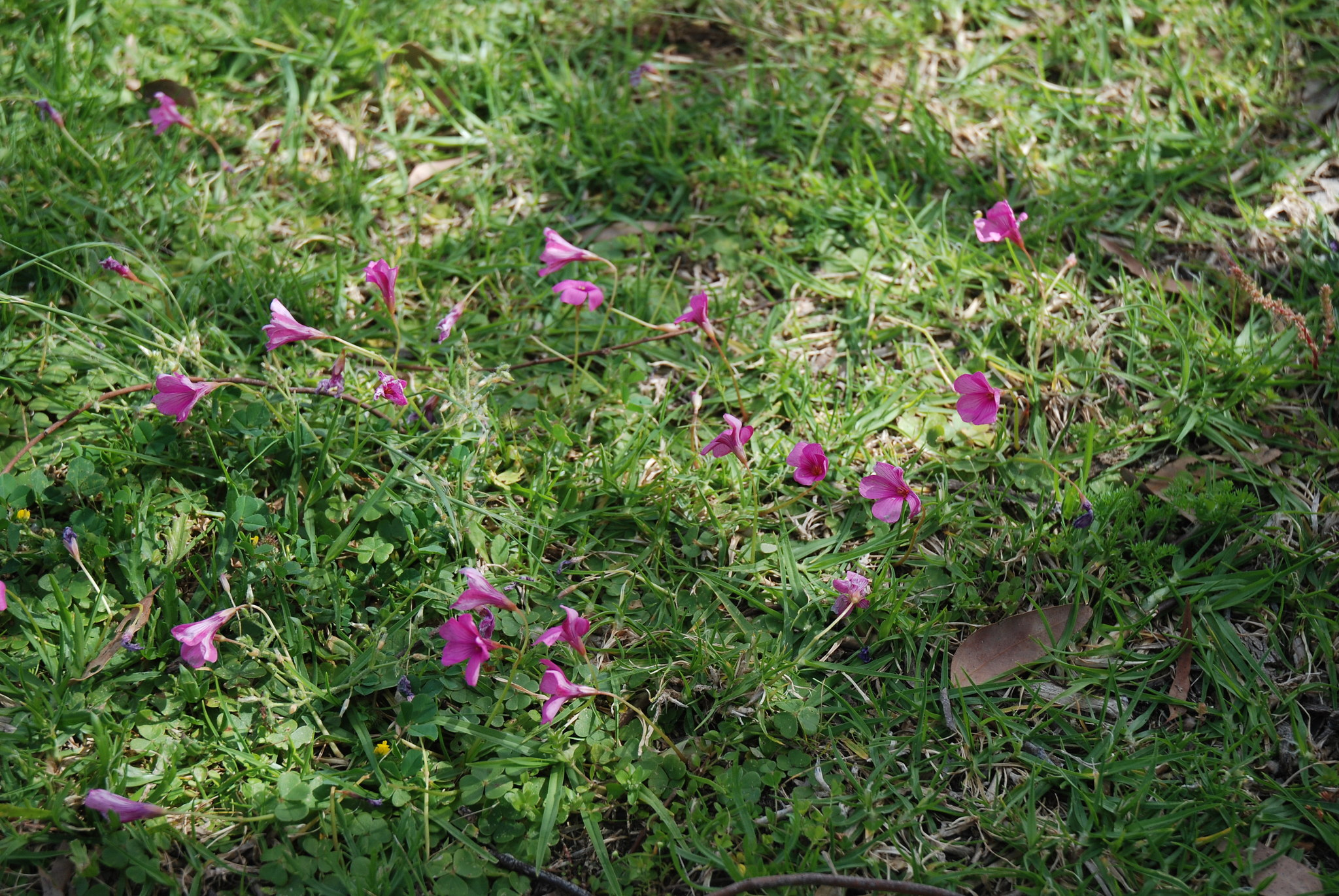
