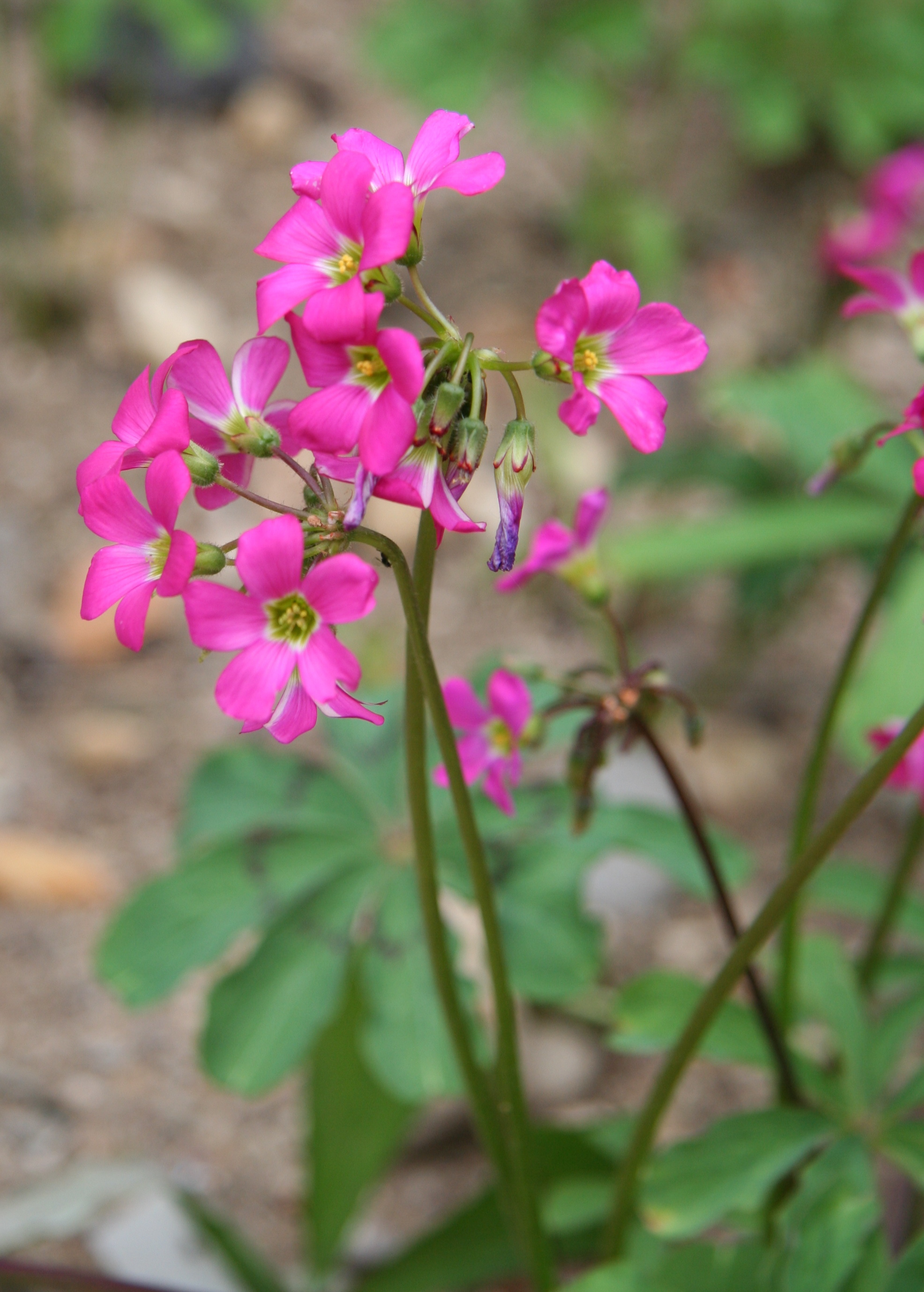

Scientific classification
- Kingdom: Plantae
- Clade: Tracheophytes
- Clade: Angiosperms
- Clade: Eudicots
- Clade: Rosids
- Order: Oxalidales
- Family: Oxalidaceae
- Genus: Oxalis
- Species: O. lasiandra

Binomial name
- Oxalis lasiandra Zucc.

Synonyms
- Ionoxalis conzattiana Rose; Ionoxalis gonzalesii Rose; Ionoxalis lasiandra (Zucc.) Rose; Oxalis conzattiana (Rose) R. Knuth; Oxalis gonzalesii (Rose) R. Knuth

= Oxalis lasiandra =

Species of tree

Oxalis lasiandra, common names palm tree oxalis and Mexican shamrock, is a plant species native to the Mexican State of Oaxaca but grown as an ornamental in other regions. It occurs in Quercus-Acacia and Quercus forests at elevations of 1,700–2,160 m (5,580–7,090 ft).

Oxalis lasiandra is a perennial herb up to 40 cm (16 in) tall. It is closely related to O. magnifica but the bulb scales have 15–25 nerves. Leaves have 7–9 leaflets. Flowers are pink to crimson, drooping at night but pointing upward in the daytime.
