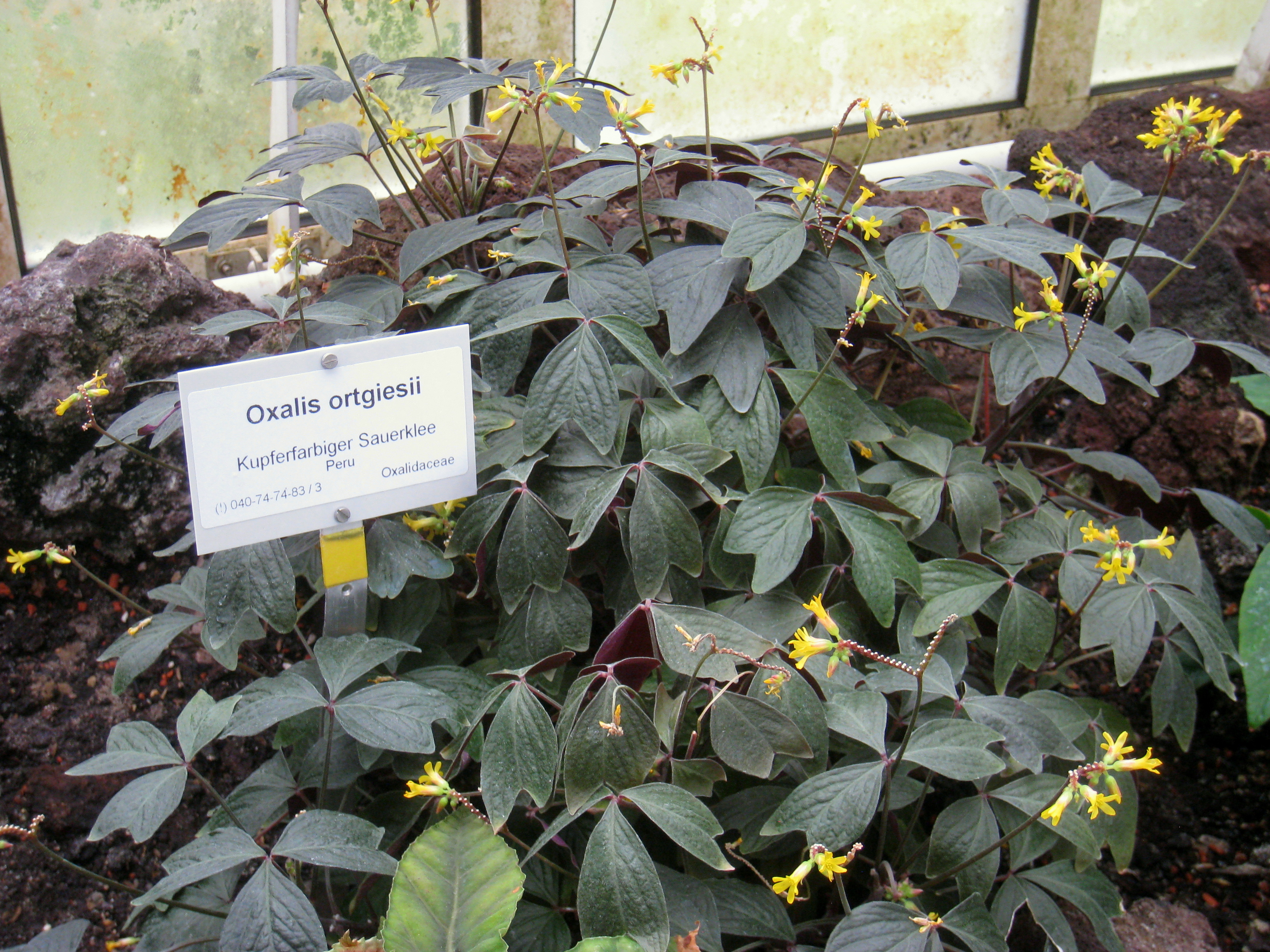

Scientific classification
- Kingdom: Plantae
- Clade: Tracheophytes
- Clade: Angiosperms
- Clade: Eudicots
- Clade: Rosids
- Order: Oxalidales
- Family: Oxalidaceae
- Genus: Oxalis
- Species: O. ortgiesii

Binomial name
- Oxalis ortgiesii Regel

= Oxalis ortgiesii =

Species of flowering plant

Oxalis ortgiesii, the fishtail oxalis, is a species of Oxalis (wood sorrel) native to Bolivia, Ecuador, and Peru. The three leaflets are deeply cleft at the tip, and purple on the underside. The yellow flowers have three stamen lengths and three pistil lengths, ordered in such a way that stamens and pistil of any one flower are never of the same length, guaranteeing cross-pollination.
