= Oxalis ecuadorensis =

Conservation status
- Endangered (IUCN 3.1)

Scientific classification
- Kingdom: Plantae
- Clade: Tracheophytes
- Clade: Angiosperms
- Clade: Eudicots
- Clade: Rosids
- Order: Oxalidales
- Family: Oxalidaceae
- Genus: Oxalis
- Species: O. ecuadorensis

Binomial name
- Oxalis ecuadorensis R.Knuth

Species of flowering plant

Oxalis ecuadorensis is a species of plant in the family Oxalidaceae. It is endemic to Ecuador.

== Subspecies ==
As of July 2023, Plants of the World Online accepts 2 subspecies of O. ecaudorensis:

- Oxalis ecuadorensis subsp. ecuadorensis
- Oxalis ecuadorensis subsp. gentryi Lourteig
