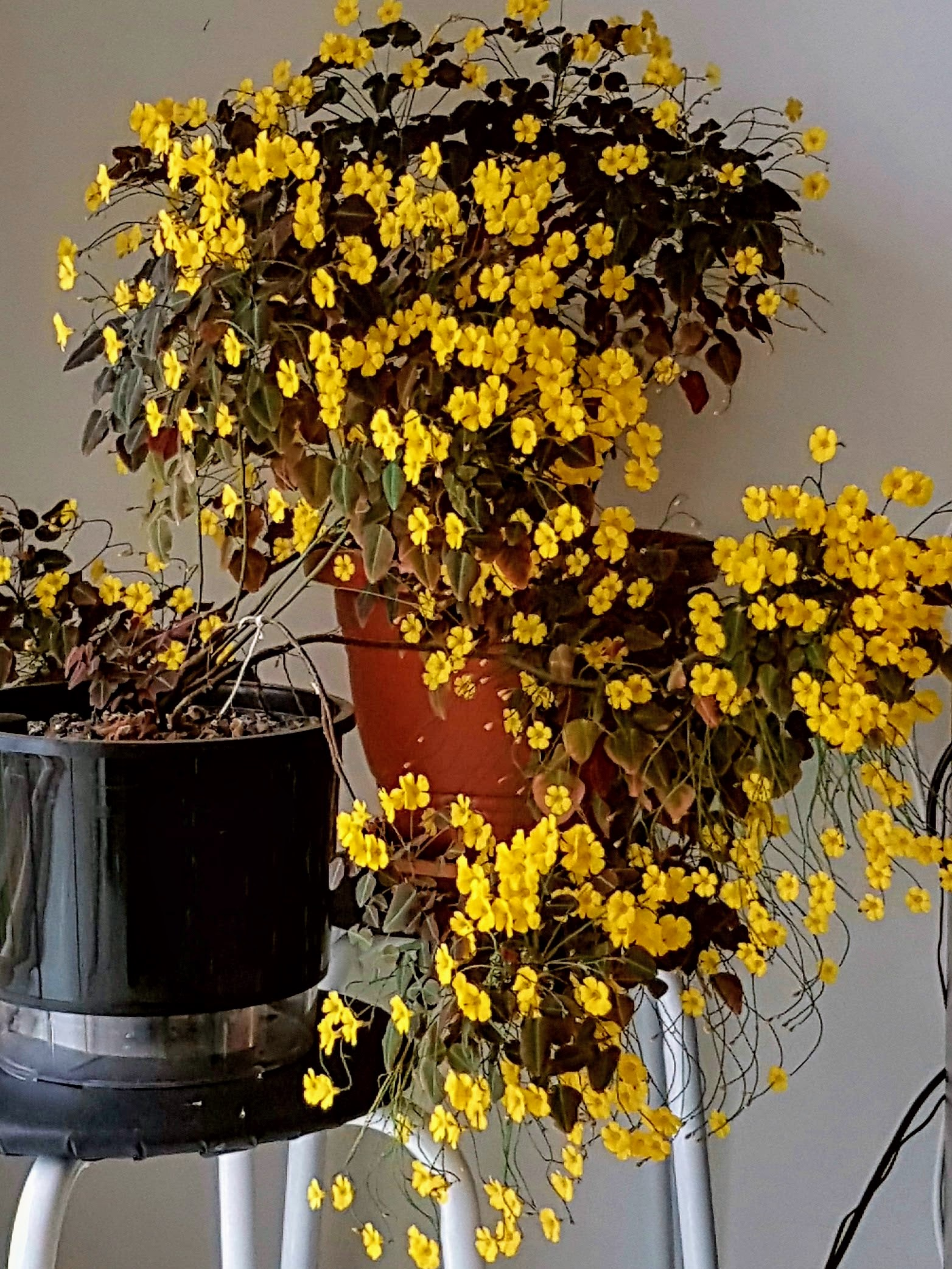

Scientific classification
- Kingdom: Plantae
- Clade: Tracheophytes
- Clade: Angiosperms
- Clade: Eudicots
- Clade: Rosids
- Order: Oxalidales
- Family: Oxalidaceae
- Genus: Oxalis
- Species: O. hedysaroides

Binomial name
- Oxalis hedysaroides Kunth

= Oxalis hedysaroides =

Species of flowering plant

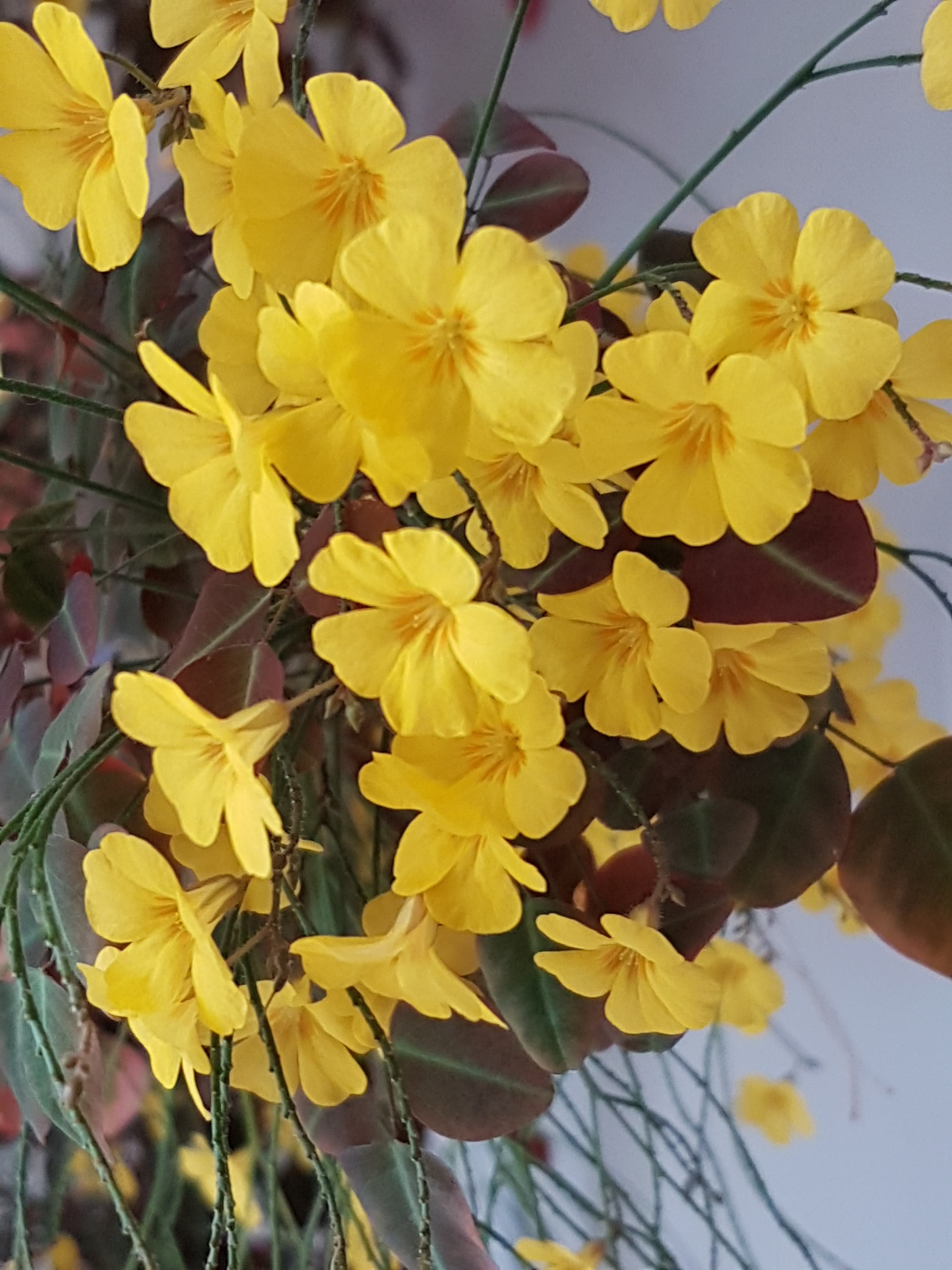
Flowers of Oxalis hedysaroides

Oxalis hedysaroides, known as the fire fern, is not a fern but a flowering perennial plant native throughout Colombia and Ecuador. It is a member of the woodsorrel genus (Oxalis) that grows to 30 cm height and 10 cm spread.

The plant gets its common name from the fact that its leaves, while starting green, turn a deep purple red with exposure to sun. Oxalis hedysaroides is a very mobile plant and will rotate its foliage significantly to follow the sun. At dusk, the plant can seem to quiver slightly as the red leaves partially close by folding in half.

The foliage of the fire fern is supported by branched wiry purple stems, and the plant produces small yellow flowers when in bloom.
