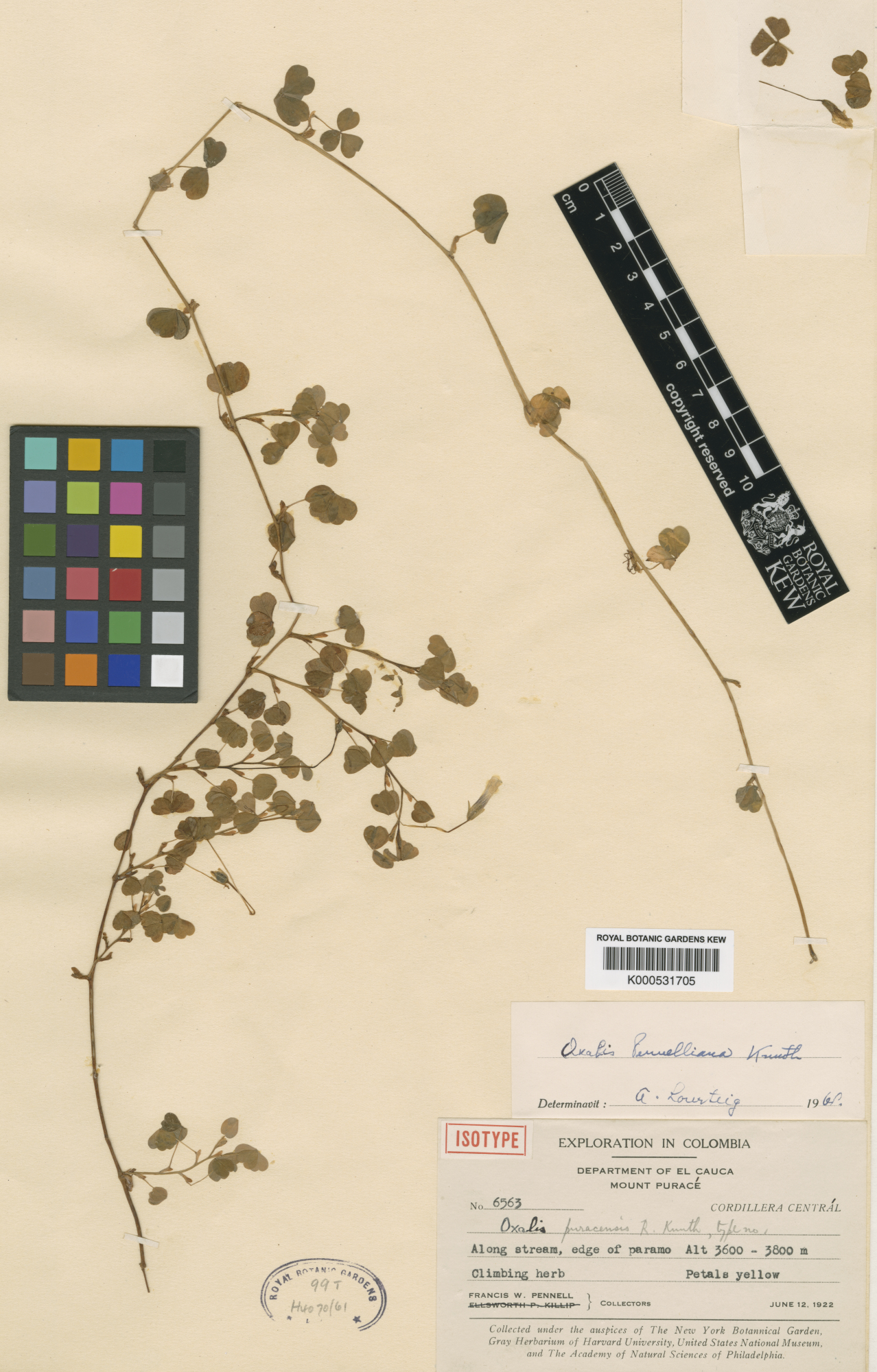

Conservation status
- Endangered (IUCN 3.1)

Scientific classification
- Kingdom: Plantae
- Clade: Tracheophytes
- Clade: Angiosperms
- Clade: Eudicots
- Clade: Rosids
- Order: Oxalidales
- Family: Oxalidaceae
- Genus: Oxalis
- Species: O. pennelliana

Binomial name
- Oxalis pennelliana R.Knuth

= Oxalis pennelliana =

Species of flowering plant

Oxalis pennelliana is a species of plant in the family Oxalidaceae. It is endemic to Ecuador.
