= List of Oxalis species =

The following 583 species in the flowering plant genus Oxalis, many of which are called wood sorrels, wood‑sorrels or woodsorrels, false shamrocks, and sourgrasses, are recognised by Plants of the World Online:

== A ==
- Oxalis abercornensis R.Knuth
- Oxalis acetosella L.
- Oxalis acromelaena Diels
- Oxalis acuminata Schltdl.
- Oxalis adenodes Sond.
- Oxalis adenophylla Gillies ex Hook. & Arn.
- Oxalis adpressipila (Lourteig) Fiaschi & Bilk
- Oxalis adspersa Eckl. & Zeyh.
- Oxalis alata Zucc.
- Oxalis albicans Kunth
- Oxalis albiuscula T.M.Salter
- Oxalis algoensis Eckl. & Zeyh.
- Oxalis alpina (Rose) Rose ex R.Knuth
- Oxalis alstonii Lourteig
- Oxalis alvimii Lourteig
- Oxalis amamiana Hatus.
- Oxalis ambigua Jacq.
- Oxalis amblyodonta T.M.Salter
- Oxalis amblyosepala Schltr.
- Oxalis amicorum Canelón, Dorr & S.M.Niño
- Oxalis andina Britton
- Oxalis androsacea R.Knuth
- Oxalis annae F.Bolus
- Oxalis anomala T.M.Salter
- Oxalis anthelmintica A.Rich.
- Oxalis aptera Zucc. ex Progel
- Oxalis apurimacensis Lourteig
- Oxalis arachnoidea Progel
- Oxalis arbuscula Barnéoud
- Oxalis arenaria Bertero
- Oxalis areolata Taub.
- Oxalis argentina R.Knuth
- Oxalis argillacea F.Bolus
- Oxalis argyrophylla T.M.Salter
- Oxalis aridicola T.M.Salter
- Oxalis artemioides Fiaschi
- Oxalis articulata Savigny
- Oxalis atacamensis Reiche
- Oxalis attaquana T.M.Salter
- Oxalis aurea Schltr.
- Oxalis aureoflava Steud.
- Oxalis ausensis R.Knuth

== B ==
- Oxalis bakeriana Exell
- Oxalis balansae Guillaumin
- Oxalis barrelieri L.
- Oxalis bartolomensis R.Knuth
- Oxalis bela-vitoriae Lourteig
- Oxalis benjaminii Lourteig
- Oxalis bermejensis R.Knuth
- Oxalis bifida Thunb.
- Oxalis bifrons Progel
- Oxalis bifurca G.Lodd.
- Oxalis bipartita A.St.-Hil.
- Oxalis bisecta Norlind
- Oxalis bisfracta Turcz.
- Oxalis blackii Lourteig
- Oxalis blanchetii R.Knuth
- Oxalis blastorhiza T.M.Salter
- Oxalis bojeriana Baill.
- Oxalis boliviana Britton
- Oxalis bowiei W.T.Aiton ex G.Don
- Oxalis brasiliensis G.Lodd. ex Drapiez
- Oxalis brevis Phil.
- Oxalis bulbigera R.Knuth
- Oxalis bulbillifera X.S.Shen & Hao Sun
- Oxalis bulbocastanum Phil.
- Oxalis bullulata T.M.Salter
- Oxalis burkei Sond.
- Oxalis burtoniae T.M.Salter

== C ==
- Oxalis caerulea (Small) R.Knuth
- Oxalis caesariata Lourteig
- Oxalis caesia Phil.
- Oxalis cajalbanensis Urb.
- Oxalis calachaccensis R.Knuth
- Oxalis californica (Abrams) R.Knuth
- Oxalis callosa R.Knuth
- Oxalis calva Progel
- Oxalis calviniensis R.Knuth
- Oxalis camelopardalis T.M.Salter
- Oxalis campicola T.M.Salter
- Oxalis campylorhiza T.M.Salter
- Oxalis canaliculata Dreyer, Roets & Oberl.
- Oxalis capillacea E.Mey. ex Sond.
- Oxalis capixaba Fiaschi & Bilk
- Oxalis caprina Thunb.
- Oxalis cardenasiana Lourteig
- Oxalis carminea R.Knuth
- Oxalis carolina J.Suda & Sudová
- Oxalis cathara T.M.Salter
- Oxalis caucensis R.Knuth
- Oxalis cerradoana Lourteig
- Oxalis chachahuensis Alfonso, Prina & Muiño
- Oxalis chamaecrista Baill.
- Oxalis chapmaniae Exell
- Oxalis chartacea Norlind
- Oxalis chasquiensis R.Knuth
- Oxalis chnoodes Lourteig
- Oxalis ciliaris Jacq.
- Oxalis ciliata Spreng.
- Oxalis cinerea Zucc.
- Oxalis cipoensis T.Costa, Sakur. & Fiaschi
- Oxalis clandestina Phil.
- Oxalis clausenii Lourteig
- Oxalis clavifolia Sond.
- Oxalis clematodes Donn.Sm.
- Oxalis colatinensis Fiaschi
- Oxalis colchaguensis Lourteig
- Oxalis colorea (Small) R.Knuth
- Oxalis commutata Sond.
- Oxalis comosa E.Mey. ex Sond.
- Oxalis compacta Gillies ex Hook. & Arn.
- Oxalis compressa Thunb.
- Oxalis comptonii T.M.Salter
- Oxalis confertifolia (Kuntze) R.Knuth
- Oxalis confertissima A.St.-Hil.
- Oxalis conorrhiza Jacq.
- Oxalis conventionensis Lourteig
- Oxalis convexula Jacq.
- Oxalis copiosa F.Bolus
- Oxalis coralleoides R.Knuth
- Oxalis cordata A.St.-Hil., A.Juss. & Cambess.
- Oxalis cornicarpa Fiaschi
- Oxalis corniculata L.
- Oxalis cotagaitensis R.Knuth
- Oxalis cratensis Hook.
- Oxalis creaseyi T.M.Salter
- Oxalis crispula Sond.
- Oxalis crocea T.M.Salter
- Oxalis cuatrecasasii Lourteig
- Oxalis cuneata Jacq.
- Oxalis cuzcensis R.Knuth
- Oxalis cytisoides Zucc.

== D ==
- Oxalis daitunensis S.S.Ying
- Oxalis davyana R.Knuth
- Oxalis debilis Kunth
- Oxalis decaphylla Kunth
- Oxalis decipiens Progel
- Oxalis dehradunensis Raizada
- Oxalis densa N.E.Br.
- Oxalis densifolia Zucc.
- Oxalis depressa Eckl. & Zeyh.
- Oxalis deserticola T.M.Salter
- Oxalis diamantinae R.Knuth
- Oxalis dichondrifolia A.Gray
- Oxalis dichotoma T.M.Salter
- Oxalis dilatata L.Bolus
- Oxalis dillenii Jacq.
- Oxalis dimidiata Donn.Sm.
- Oxalis dines Ornduff
- Oxalis discolor Klotzsch
- Oxalis disticha Jacq.
- Oxalis distincta R.Knuth
- Oxalis divaricata Zucc.
- Oxalis divergens Benth. ex Lindl.
- Oxalis doceana Lourteig
- Oxalis dolichopoda Diels
- Oxalis dombeyi A.St.-Hil.
- Oxalis dregei Sond.
- Oxalis dreyerae Oberl. & Roets
- Oxalis droseroides E.Mey. ex Sond.
- Oxalis drummondii A.Gray
- Oxalis dudleyi Lourteig
- Oxalis dumetorum Barnéoud
- Oxalis duriuscula Schltr.

== E ==
- Oxalis ebracteata Savigny
- Oxalis eckloniana C.Presl
- Oxalis ecuadorensis R.Knuth
- Oxalis elegans Kunth
- Oxalis elsae R.Knuth
- Oxalis engleriana Schltr.
- Oxalis enneaphylla Cav.
- Oxalis eremobia Phil.
- Oxalis ericifolia Oberl. & Dreyer
- Oxalis ericoides R.Knuth
- Oxalis eriocarpa DC.
- Oxalis eriolepis Wedd.
- Oxalis erosa R.Knuth
- Oxalis erythrorhiza Gillies ex Hook. & Arn.
- Oxalis exilis A.Cunn.
- Oxalis exserta T.M.Salter
- Oxalis extensa T.M.Salter

== F ==
- Oxalis falcatula T.M.Salter
- Oxalis famatinae R.Knuth
- Oxalis fendleri Lourteig
- Oxalis fenestrata Dreyer, Roets & Oberl.
- Oxalis fergusoniae T.M.Salter
- Oxalis fibrosa F.Bolus
- Oxalis filifoliolata J.Suda & Krejčíková
- Oxalis filiformis Kunth
- Oxalis flagellata (Rusby) Lourteig
- Oxalis flava L.
- Oxalis flaviuscula T.M.Salter
- Oxalis florida Salisb.
- Oxalis fourcadei T.M.Salter
- Oxalis foveolata Turcz.
- Oxalis fragilis T.M.Salter
- Oxalis frutescens L.
- Oxalis fruticosa Raddi
- Oxalis furcillata T.M.Salter

== G ==
- Oxalis gagneorum Fosberg & Sachet
- Oxalis gardneriana Progel
- Oxalis geralensis R.Knuth
- Oxalis giftbergensis T.M.Salter
- Oxalis glabra Thunb.
- Oxalis glauca Kunth
- Oxalis glaucescens Norlind
- Oxalis goetzei Engl.
- Oxalis goniorhiza Eckl. & Zeyh.
- Oxalis goyazensis Turcz.
- Oxalis gracilipes Schltr.
- Oxalis gracilis Jacq.
- Oxalis grammopetala Sond.
- Oxalis grammophylla T.M.Salter
- Oxalis grandis Small
- Oxalis gregaria R.Knuth
- Oxalis griffithii Edgew. & Hook.f.
- Oxalis grisea A.St.-Hil. & Naudin
- Oxalis gyrorhiza Bertero ex Colla

== H ==
- Oxalis haedulipes T.M.Salter
- Oxalis hedysarifolia Raddi
- Oxalis hedysaroides Kunth
- Oxalis heidelbergensis T.M.Salter
- Oxalis helicoides T.M.Salter
- Oxalis hepatica Norlind
- Oxalis hernandesii DC.
- Oxalis herrerae R.Knuth
- Oxalis heterophylla DC.
- Oxalis hirsuta Sond.
- Oxalis hirsutibulba Dreyer, Roets & Oberl.
- Oxalis hirsutissima Zucc.
- Oxalis hirta L.
- Oxalis hispidula Zucc.
- Oxalis hochreutineri J.F.Macbr.
- Oxalis holosericea Phil.
- Oxalis huantensis R.Knuth
- Oxalis humbertii Lourteig
- Oxalis humblotii R.Knuth
- Oxalis hyalotricha Lourteig
- Oxalis hygrophila Dreyer
- Oxalis hypopilina Diels
- Oxalis hypsophila Phil.

== I ==
- Oxalis illinoensis Schwegman
- Oxalis imbricata Eckl. & Zeyh.
- Oxalis impatiens Vell.
- Oxalis inaequalis Weintroub
- Oxalis incarnata L.
- Oxalis inconspicua T.M.Salter
- Oxalis inopinata Fiaschi & Bilk
- Oxalis integra R.Knuth
- Oxalis involuta T.M.Salter
- Oxalis ioeides T.M.Salter & Exell
- Oxalis itamarajuensis Fiaschi & Bilk

== J ==
- Oxalis jacobinensis Fiaschi & F.S.Cabral
- Oxalis jacquiniana Kunth
- Oxalis jamesonii Lourteig
- Oxalis jasminifolia Norlind
- Oxalis johnstonii R.Knuth
- Oxalis juruensis Diels

== K ==
- Oxalis kalbreyeri Lourteig
- Oxalis kamiesbergensis T.M.Salter
- Oxalis killipii Lourteig
- Oxalis knuthiana T.M.Salter
- Oxalis kollmannii Fiaschi
- Oxalis kuhlmannii Lourteig

== L ==
- Oxalis laciniata Cav.
- Oxalis lanata Thunb.
- Oxalis lasiandra Zucc.
- Oxalis lasiopetala Zucc.
- Oxalis lasiorhiza T.M.Salter
- Oxalis latemucronata Lourteig
- Oxalis latifolia Kunth
- Oxalis lawsonii F.Bolus
- Oxalis laxa Hook. & Arn.
- Oxalis laxicaulis R.Knuth
- Oxalis leipoldtii Schltr.
- Oxalis leonii Fiaschi & Bilk
- Oxalis leptocalyx Sond.
- Oxalis leptogramma T.M.Salter
- Oxalis leptopodes G.Don
- Oxalis lespedezioides G.Don
- Oxalis leucolepis Diels
- Oxalis leucophylla Phil.
- Oxalis levis T.M.Salter
- Oxalis libertatis Lourteig
- Oxalis lichenoides T.M.Salter
- Oxalis linarantha Lourteig
- Oxalis lindaviana Schltr.
- Oxalis lindneri R.Knuth
- Oxalis linearis Jacq.
- Oxalis lineolata T.M.Salter
- Oxalis linoides R.Knuth
- Oxalis livida Jacq.
- Oxalis lomana Diels
- Oxalis longissima (Kuntze) K.Schum.
- Oxalis loricata Dusén
- Oxalis lotoides Kunth
- Oxalis louisae T.M.Salter
- Oxalis lourteigiana Nuernberg-Silva & Fiaschi
- Oxalis lucumayensis R.Knuth
- Oxalis luederitzii Schinz
- Oxalis lunulata Zucc.
- Oxalis luteola Jacq.

== M ==
- Oxalis macbridei R.Knuth
- Oxalis macra Schltr.
- Oxalis macrantha (Trel.) Small
- Oxalis macrocarpa (Small) R.Knuth
- Oxalis macropoda Baker
- Oxalis madrensis S.Watson
- Oxalis magellanica G.Forst.
- Oxalis magnifica (Rose) R.Knuth
- Oxalis magnifolia Dreyer, Roets & Oberl.
- Oxalis mandioccana Raddi
- Oxalis marcapatensis R.Knuth
- Oxalis marlothii Schltr. ex R.Knuth
- Oxalis massoniana T.M.Salter
- Oxalis matancillae Lourteig
- Oxalis mathewsii R.Knuth
- Oxalis medicaginea Kunth
- Oxalis megalorrhiza Jacq.
- Oxalis meisneri Sond.
- Oxalis melanograpta T.M.Salter
- Oxalis melanosticta Sond.
- Oxalis melilotoides Zucc.
- Oxalis melindae Lourteig
- Oxalis metcalfei (Small) R.Knuth
- Oxalis microcarpa Benth.
- Oxalis microdonta T.M.Salter
- Oxalis minima Ruiz & Pav. ex G.Don
- Oxalis minuta Thunb.
- Oxalis mira Lourteig
- Oxalis mirbelii Dehnh.
- Oxalis modestior R.Knuth
- Oxalis mollendoensis J.M.H.Shaw
- Oxalis mollis Kunth
- Oxalis mollissima (Rusby) R.Knuth
- Oxalis monochasiata Fiaschi
- Oxalis monophylla L.
- Oxalis montana Raf.
- Oxalis monticola Arechav.
- Oxalis moqueguensis R.Knuth
- Oxalis morelosii Pérez-Calix
- Oxalis morenoensis Lourteig
- Oxalis morronei Alicia López & Múlgura
- Oxalis mucronulata Norlind
- Oxalis multicaulis Eckl. & Zeyh.
- Oxalis muscoides Phil.
- Oxalis myriophylla A.St.-Hil.

== N ==
- Oxalis nahuelhuapiensis Speg.
- Oxalis namaquana Sond.
- Oxalis natans Thunb.
- Oxalis nelsonii (Small) R.Knuth
- Oxalis neuwiedii Zucc.
- Oxalis nidulans Eckl. & Zeyh.
- Oxalis niederleiniana Hieron. ex R.Knuth
- Oxalis niederleinii R.Knuth
- Oxalis nigrescens A.St.-Hil.
- Oxalis nipponica S.Aoki & J.Murata
- Oxalis nivea Roets, Dreyer & Oberl.
- Oxalis noctiflora R.M.MacFarl., Dreyer, Roets & Oberl.
- Oxalis nortieri T.M.Salter
- Oxalis novae-caledoniae R.Knuth & Schltr.
- Oxalis novae-guineensis Lourteig
- Oxalis novemfoliolata Heibl & Martic.
- Oxalis nubigena Walp.
- Oxalis nudiflora DC.

== O ==
- Oxalis obliquifolia Steud. ex A.Rich.
- Oxalis obtriangulata Maxim.
- Oxalis obtusa Jacq.
- Oxalis occulta Fiaschi & Bilk
- Oxalis oculifera E.G.H.Oliv.
- Oxalis odonellii Lourteig
- Oxalis odorata J.C.Manning & Goldblatt
- Oxalis oligophylla T.M.Salter
- Oxalis oligotricha Baker
- Oxalis orbicularis Sialter
- Oxalis oregana Nutt.
- Oxalis oreithala T.M.Salter
- Oxalis ornithopus Phil.
- Oxalis ortgiesii Regel
- Oxalis orthopoda T.M.Salter
- Oxalis ostenii Arechav.
- Oxalis oulophora Lourteig
- Oxalis ovalleana Phil.

== P ==
- Oxalis pachyrrhiza Wedd.
- Oxalis pallens Eckl. & Zeyh.
- Oxalis palmifrons T.M.Salter
- Oxalis paludosa A.St.-Hil.
- Oxalis pampeana Nuernberg-Silva & Fiaschi
- Oxalis papuana F.Muell.
- Oxalis paramoensis Canelón, Dorr & S.M.Niño
- Oxalis paranaensis Lourteig
- Oxalis pardalis Sond.
- Oxalis pardoensis (Lourteig) T.Costa & Fiaschi
- Oxalis paucartambensis R.Knuth
- Oxalis pavonii G.Don
- Oxalis peduncularis Kunth
- Oxalis pendulifolia T.M.Salter
- Oxalis penicillata Phil.
- Oxalis pennelliana R.Knuth
- Oxalis perdicaria (Molina) Bertero
- Oxalis perennans Haw.
- Oxalis perineson T.M.Salter & Exell
- Oxalis peruviana Norlind
- Oxalis pes-caprae L.
- Oxalis petiolulata F.Bolus
- Oxalis petraea T.M.Salter
- Oxalis petricola Dreyer, Roets & Oberl.
- Oxalis petrophila R.Knuth
- Oxalis phaeotricha Diels
- Oxalis phaseolifolia (Rusby) R.Knuth
- Oxalis phloxidiflora Schltr.
- Oxalis physocalyx Zucc. ex Progel
- Oxalis picchensis R.Knuth
- Oxalis pickeringii A.Gray
- Oxalis pillansiana T.M.Salter & Exell
- Oxalis pilosa Nutt.
- Oxalis pilulifera Progel
- Oxalis pinetorum (Small) Urb.
- Oxalis pinguiculacea R.Knuth
- Oxalis platylepis Wedd.
- Oxalis pocockiae L.Bolus
- Oxalis polymorpha Zucc.
- Oxalis polyphylla Jacq.
- Oxalis polyrhiza R.Knuth
- Oxalis porphyriosiphon T.M.Salter
- Oxalis potamophila Lourteig
- Oxalis praetexta Progel
- Oxalis pretoensis Lourteig
- Oxalis primavera (Rose) R.Knuth
- Oxalis primuloides R.Knuth
- Oxalis procumbens Steud. ex A.Rich.
- Oxalis psammophila G.Will.
- Oxalis pseudocernua R.Knuth
- Oxalis pseudohirta T.M.Salter
- Oxalis pseudolobata R.Knuth
- Oxalis pseudoviolacea R.Knuth
- Oxalis psilopoda Turcz.
- Oxalis psoraleoides Kunth
- Oxalis ptychoclada Diels
- Oxalis puberula Nees & Mart.
- Oxalis pulchella Jacq.
- Oxalis pulvinata T.M.Salter
- Oxalis punctata Thunb.
- Oxalis punensis R.Knuth
- Oxalis purpurascens T.M.Salter
- Oxalis purpurata Jacq.
- Oxalis purpurea L.
- Oxalis pusilla Jacq.
- Oxalis pycnophylla Wedd.
- Oxalis pyrenea Taub.

== R ==
- Oxalis ranchillos J.M.Watson & A.R.Flores
- Oxalis reclinata Jacq.
- Oxalis recticaulis Sond.
- Oxalis reflexa T.M.Salter
- Oxalis refracta A.St.-Hil.
- Oxalis renifolia R.Knuth
- Oxalis retrorsa Fiaschi & Bilk
- Oxalis rhombeo-ovata A.St.-Hil.
- Oxalis rhombifolia Jacq.
- Oxalis rhomboidea T.M.Salter
- Oxalis ricardii Lourteig
- Oxalis rigidicaulis R.Knuth
- Oxalis riparia Norlind
- Oxalis robinsonii T.M.Salter & Exell
- Oxalis robusta (Rose) R.Knuth
- Oxalis rosea Jacq.
- Oxalis roselata A.St.-Hil.
- Oxalis rosettifolia Roets, Dreyer & Oberl.
- Oxalis rubens Haw.
- Oxalis rubricallosa Oberl., Dreyer & Roets
- Oxalis rubropunctata T.M.Salter
- Oxalis rugeliana Urb.
- Oxalis rupestris A.St.-Hil.
- Oxalis rusbyi Lourteig
- Oxalis rutenbergii O.Hoffm.

== S ==
- Oxalis salteri L.Bolus
- Oxalis salteriana V.V.Byalt
- Oxalis salticola Lourteig
- Oxalis saltusbelli Dreyer & Roets
- Oxalis salvadorensis Sidwell
- Oxalis san-miguelii R.Knuth
- Oxalis sandemanii Lourteig
- Oxalis sarmentosa Zucc.
- Oxalis scandens Kunth
- Oxalis schaeferi R.Knuth
- Oxalis sciophila Fiaschi & Bilk
- Oxalis scoparia Norlind ex Urb.
- Oxalis sellowiana Zucc.
- Oxalis sellowii Spreng.
- Oxalis semiloba Sond.
- Oxalis semitruncata Lourteig
- Oxalis senecta T.M.Salter
- Oxalis sepalosa Diels
- Oxalis sepium A.St.-Hil.
- Oxalis septentrionalis Fiaschi & Bilk
- Oxalis serpens A.St.-Hil.
- Oxalis setosa E.Mey. ex Sond.
- Oxalis shibeishanensis Huan C.Wang & Ye Tian
- Oxalis simplex T.M.Salter
- Oxalis simplicifolia Lorence & W.L.Wagner
- Oxalis sleumeri Lourteig
- Oxalis smalliana R.Knuth
- Oxalis smithiana Eckl. & Zeyh.
- Oxalis solomonii Lourteig
- Oxalis sonderiana (Kuntze) J.F.Macbr.
- Oxalis spiralis Ruiz & Pav. ex G.Don
- Oxalis spruceana Progel
- Oxalis squamata Zucc.
- Oxalis squarrosa Barnéoud
- Oxalis staffordiana R.Knuth
- Oxalis stellata Eckl. & Zeyh.
- Oxalis stenopetala T.M.Salter
- Oxalis stenoptera Turcz.
- Oxalis stenorhyncha T.M.Salter
- Oxalis stictocheila T.M.Salter
- Oxalis stokoei Weintroub
- Oxalis stricta L.
- Oxalis strictula Steud.
- Oxalis strigosa T.M.Salter
- Oxalis suavis R.Knuth
- Oxalis subacaulis Gillies ex Hook. & Arn.
- Oxalis suborbiculata Lourteig
- Oxalis subsessilis L.Bolus
- Oxalis subvillosa Norlind
- Oxalis suksdorfii Trel.
- Oxalis suteroides T.M.Salter

== T ==
- Oxalis tabaconasensis R.Knuth
- Oxalis tacorensis B.L.Burtt
- Oxalis taitastricta S.S.Ying
- Oxalis telmatica Lourteig
- Oxalis tenella Jacq.
- Oxalis teneriensis R.Knuth
- Oxalis tenerrima R.Knuth
- Oxalis tenuifolia Jacq.
- Oxalis tenuipes T.M.Salter
- Oxalis tenuis T.M.Salter
- Oxalis tessmannii R.Knuth
- Oxalis tetraphylla Cav.
- Oxalis texana (Small) R.Knuth
- Oxalis thelyoxys Focke
- Oxalis thompsoniae B.J.Conn & P.G.Richards
- Oxalis timida J.Vasques
- Oxalis tomentosa Thunb.
- Oxalis tortuosa Lindl.
- Oxalis tragopoda T.M.Salter
- Oxalis trianae R.Knuth
- Oxalis triangularis A.St.-Hil.
- Oxalis trichophylla Baker
- Oxalis trilliifolia Hook.
- Oxalis trollii R.Knuth
- Oxalis truncatula Jacq.
- Oxalis tuberosa Molina
- Oxalis tysonii E.Phillips

== U ==
- Oxalis uliginosa Schltr.
- Oxalis umbraticola A.St.-Hil.

== V ==
- Oxalis valdiviensis Barnéoud
- Oxalis × vanaelstii Hoste, Meeus & Groom
- Oxalis varadimalayana Anilkumar & Udayan
- Oxalis vargasii Lourteig
- Oxalis variifolia Steud.
- Oxalis veadeirosensis Lourteig
- Oxalis velutina Diels
- Oxalis versicolor L.
- Oxalis villosula R.Knuth
- Oxalis violacea L.
- Oxalis violacella A.P.Khokhr.
- Oxalis virgata Rusby
- Oxalis virginea Jacq.
- Oxalis virgosa Molina
- Oxalis viscosa E.Mey. ex Sond.
- Oxalis vulcanicola Donn.Sm.

== W, X, Z ==
- Oxalis weberbaueri Diels
- Oxalis westii Lourteig
- Oxalis williamsii R.Knuth
- Oxalis wurdackii Lourteig
- Oxalis xantha T.M.Salter
- Oxalis xerophyton R.Knuth
- Oxalis xiphophylla Baker
- Oxalis xishuiensis Y.B.Yang, M.T.An & He Li
- Oxalis yacutulensis R.Knuth
- Oxalis yungasensis Rusby
- Oxalis zamorana Lourteig
- Oxalis zeekoevleyensis R.Knuth
- Oxalis zeyheri Sond.
