= Pink flowers =

Pink flowers are used as a symbol of love and awareness. For decades, pink flowers have been used to decorate weddings as a symbol of love. They can also be used as a display of love at funerals, as demonstrated at the funeral for Anna Nicole Smith.

More recently, pink flowers have come to symbolize breast cancer awareness.

They may also be used as an expression of thanks, or just enjoyed for their aesthetic beauty.

== Species ==
Species of pink flowers include:

- Allium (flowering onion)
- Alumroot or Coralbells
- Aster
- Astilbe
- Azalea
- Begonias
- Bougainvillea
- Butterfly bush
- Camellia
- Carambola tree (starfruit)
- Cosmos
- Cranesbills
- Carnation
- Cherry
- Japanese Cherry
- Clematis
- Clover
- Coneflower (Echinacea)
- Cypripedium acaule (lady's slipper orchids)
- Dahlia
- Dianthus family (carnation, pink, and sweet william, and especially garden pink, whence the colour got its name)
- Flowering plum tree
- Hollyhock
- Hibiscus
- Hyacinth
- Hydrangea growing in alkaline (basic) soil
- Lotus
- Saucer Magnolia
- Mallow
- Forget-me-not (Myosotis)
- Oleander
- Orchid
- Oxalis or Shamrock
- Oriental lily
- Papaver orientale (Oriental poppy)
- Peony / paeony
- Petunia
- Phlox
- Evening Primrose
- Rhododendron and Azalea
- Roses
- Rose Campion
- Sabatia angularis (rosepink or bitterbloom)
- Sea thrift or Sea pink
- Tulips
- Vinca
