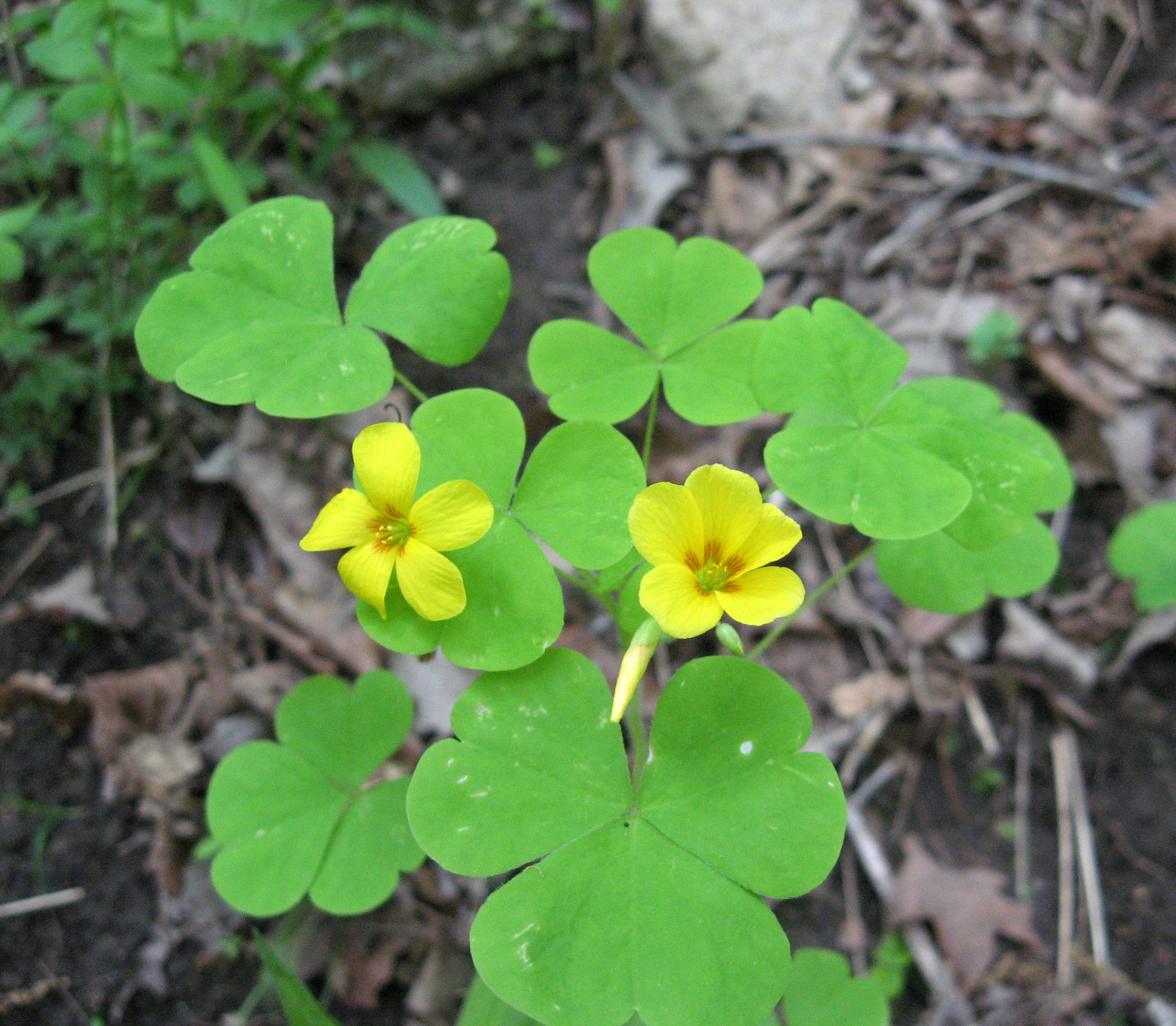

Scientific classification
- Kingdom: Plantae
- Clade: Tracheophytes
- Clade: Angiosperms
- Clade: Eudicots
- Clade: Rosids
- Order: Oxalidales
- Family: Oxalidaceae
- Genus: Oxalis
- Species: O. illinoensis

Binomial name
- Oxalis illinoensis Schwegman

= Oxalis illinoensis =

Species of flowering plant

Oxalis illinoensis, the Illinois woodsorrel, is a species of flowering plant in the woodsorrel family (Oxalidaceae). It is endemic to the United States, where it found in Illinois, Indiana, Kentucky, and Tennessee. The limits of the range of this species are unclear due to its similarity to Oxalis grandis, with which there has been confusion.

Oxalis illinoensis is a perennial that produces yellow flowers with red-lined centers. Its primary habitat is calcareous forests and bluffs.
