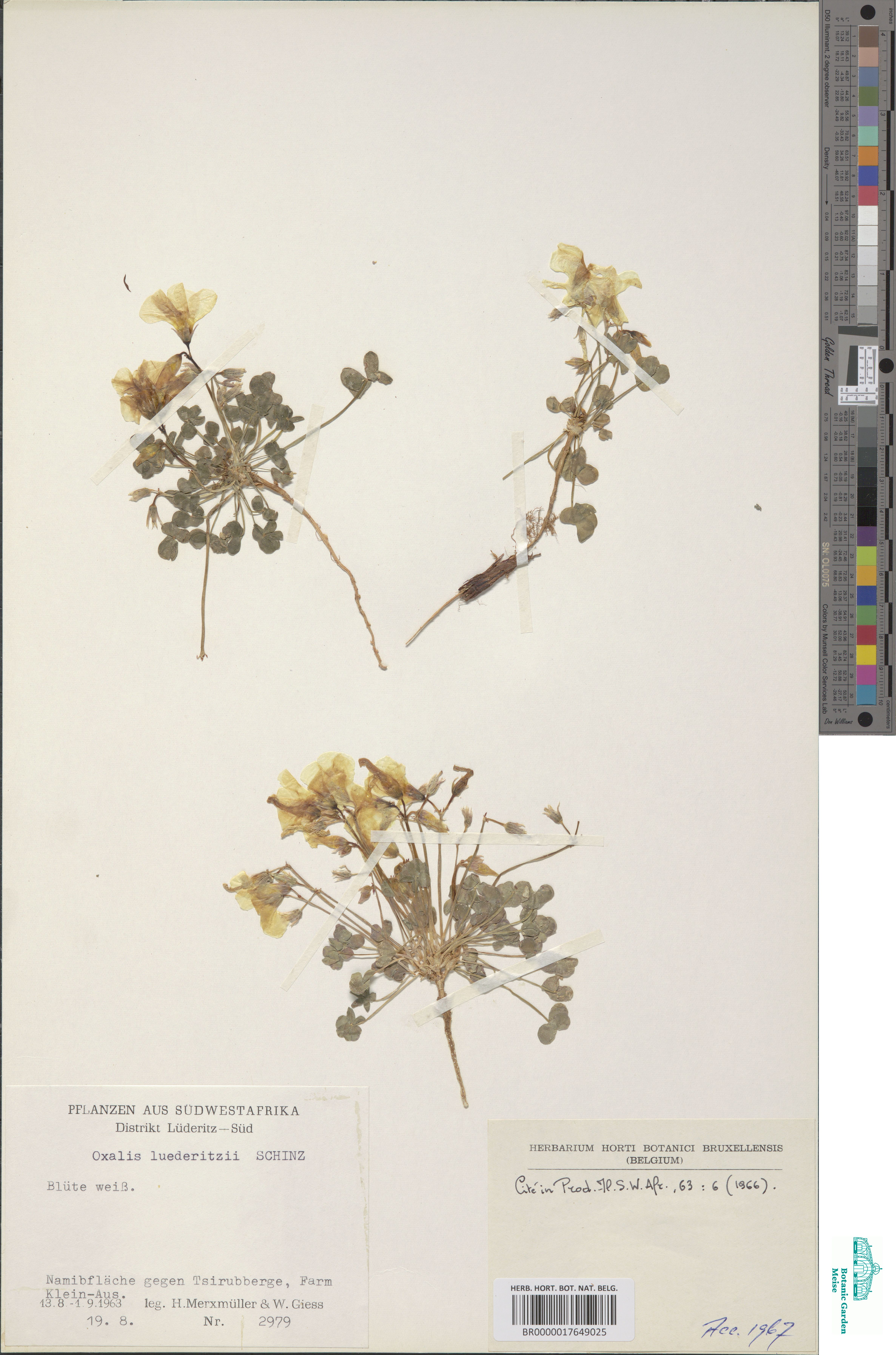

Conservation status
- Least Concern (IUCN 3.1)

Scientific classification
- Kingdom: Plantae
- Clade: Embryophytes
- Clade: Tracheophytes
- Clade: Spermatophytes
- Clade: Angiosperms
- Clade: Eudicots
- Clade: Rosids
- Order: Oxalidales
- Family: Oxalidaceae
- Genus: Oxalis
- Species: O. luederitzii

Binomial name
- Oxalis luederitzii Schinz

= Oxalis luederitzii =

Species of flowering plant

Oxalis luederitzii is an extinct species of plant in the family Oxalidaceae. It is endemic to Namibia. Its natural habitat is cold desert.
