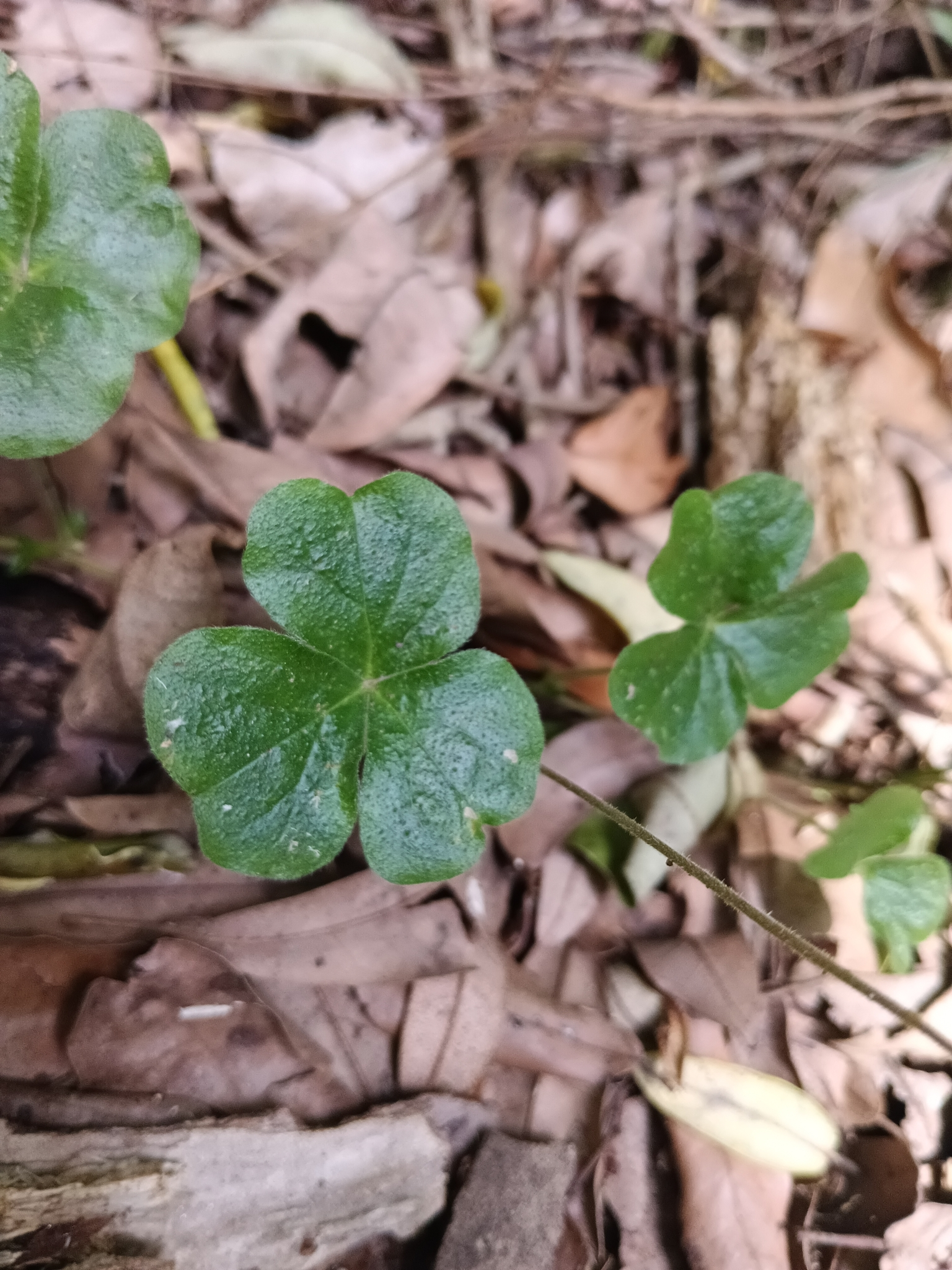
- Foliage
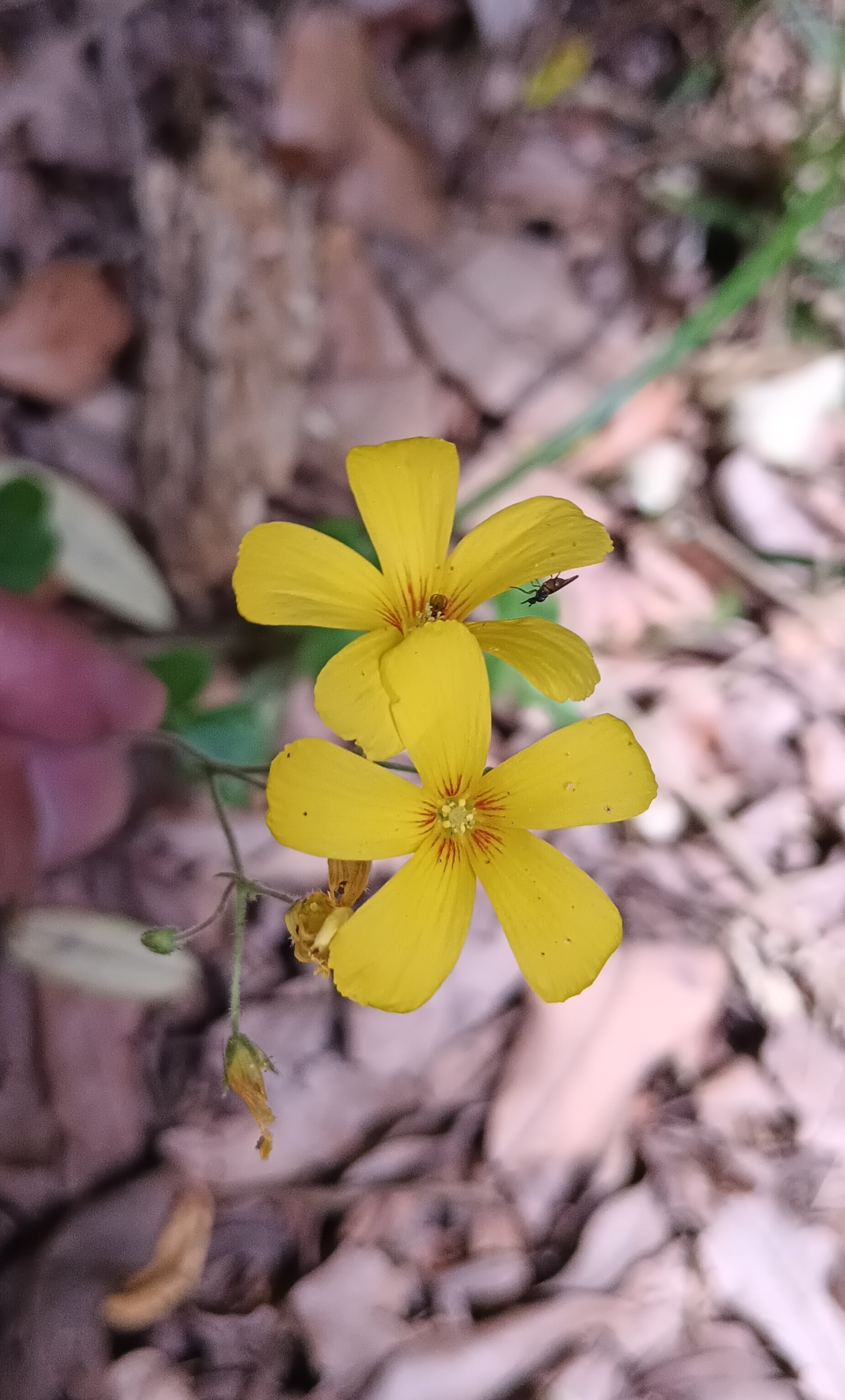
- Flowers

Scientific classification
- Kingdom: Plantae
- Clade: Tracheophytes
- Clade: Angiosperms
- Clade: Eudicots
- Clade: Rosids
- Order: Oxalidales
- Family: Oxalidaceae
- Genus: Oxalis
- Species: O. dumetorum

Binomial name
- Oxalis dumetorum Barnéoud

= Oxalis dumetorum =

Species of wood sorrel

Oxalis dumetorum is a species of flowering plant in the family Oxalidaceae. It is a perennial herb endemic to Chile, where it is distributed from the Valparaiso to the Los Lagos regions.
