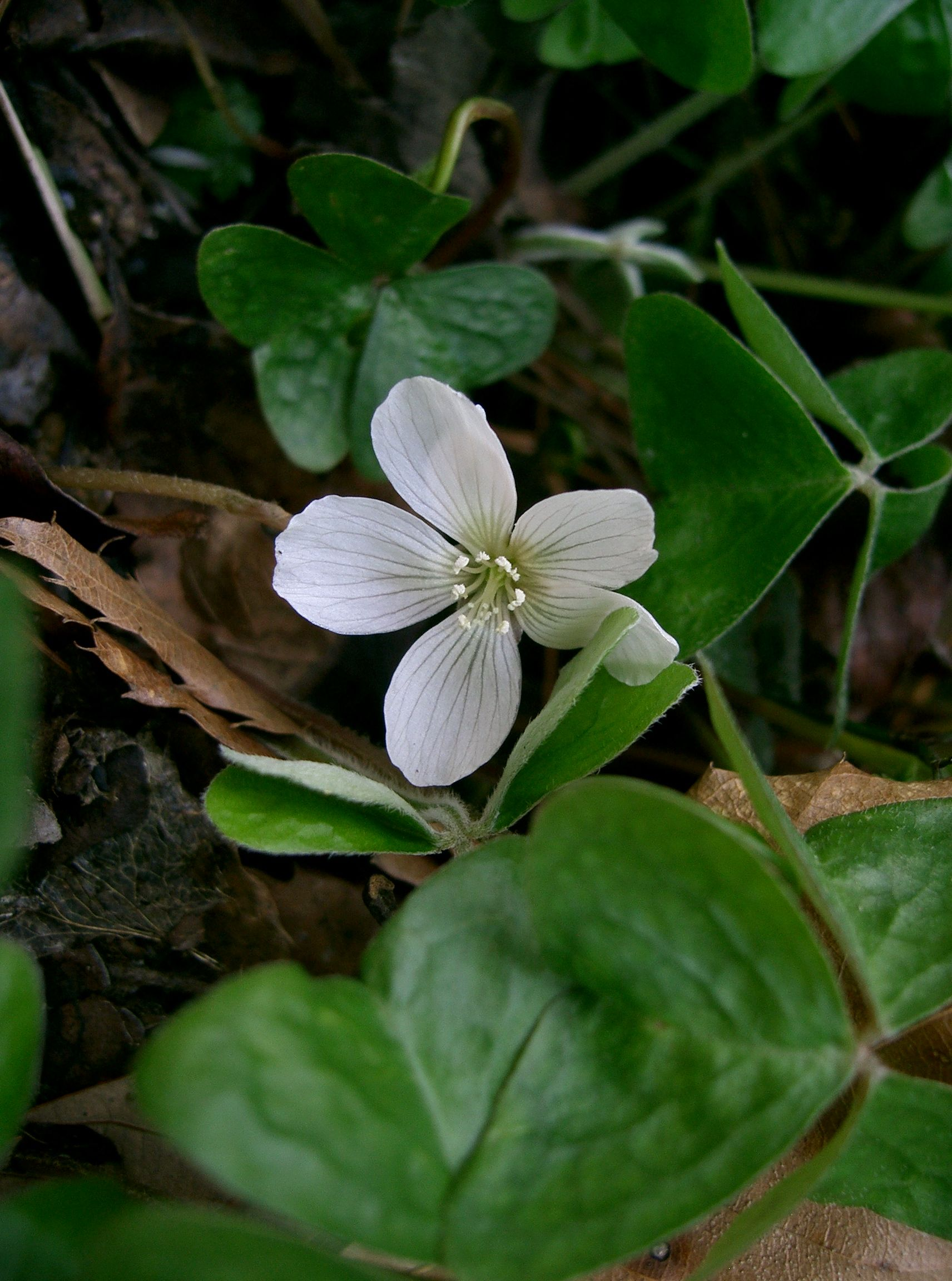

Scientific classification
- Kingdom: Plantae
- Clade: Tracheophytes
- Clade: Angiosperms
- Clade: Eudicots
- Clade: Rosids
- Order: Oxalidales
- Family: Oxalidaceae
- Genus: Oxalis
- Species: O. griffithii

Binomial name
- Oxalis griffithii Edgew. & Hook.f.

= Oxalis griffithii =

Species of flowering plant

Oxalis griffithii is a species of Oxalis found in thickets and meadows of Bhutan, China, India, and Japan.

== Description ==
O. griffithii is a perennial that reaches 7–25 cm (2.8–9.8 in) in height. It is a stemless, pubescent rhizome, densely covered by dark brown scalelike remains of leaf bases, 6–12 mm (0.24–0.47 in) thick, including scales. The scales are strigose. Leaves are basal with a petiole 6–20 cm (2.4–7.9 in). Trichomes are brown and curled. Leaflet blades are obtriangular, 1–2.5(–4.5) × 1.5–3.5(–5.5) cm in length. It is abaxially pubescent, adaxially glabrous, and the apex is broadly emarginate to subtruncate. Lobe apices are obtuse. Flowers are solitary and nodding. The peduncle is 4–15 cm (1.6–5.9 in) long, equal to or longer than leaves. Bracts at middle are flowering stalk, lanceolate, 2.5–4 mm (0.10–0.16 in), with dense trichomes along midvein and margins. Sepals are lanceolate, 5–7 mm (0.20–0.28 in) and persistent. Petals are white with lilac veins, rarely pink (Hubei), narrowly obovate, 1.2–1.6 (–2) cm long. Apex retuse is deeply emarginate. Capsule is oblongconic, 5–13 mm (0.20–0.51 in) × 5–6 mm (0.20–0.24 in). Seeds are ovoid, 2.5–3.5 mm (0.10–0.14 in), longitudinally ridged.

== Distribution and habitat ==
It thrives in mixed deciduous or coniferous forests, and thickets. It is happy in moist and dry shady places; 800–3,400 m (2,600–11,200 ft) in altitude. It inhabits China, Taiwan, Bhutan, India, Japan, Kashmir, Korea, N Myanmar, Nepal, Philippines.
