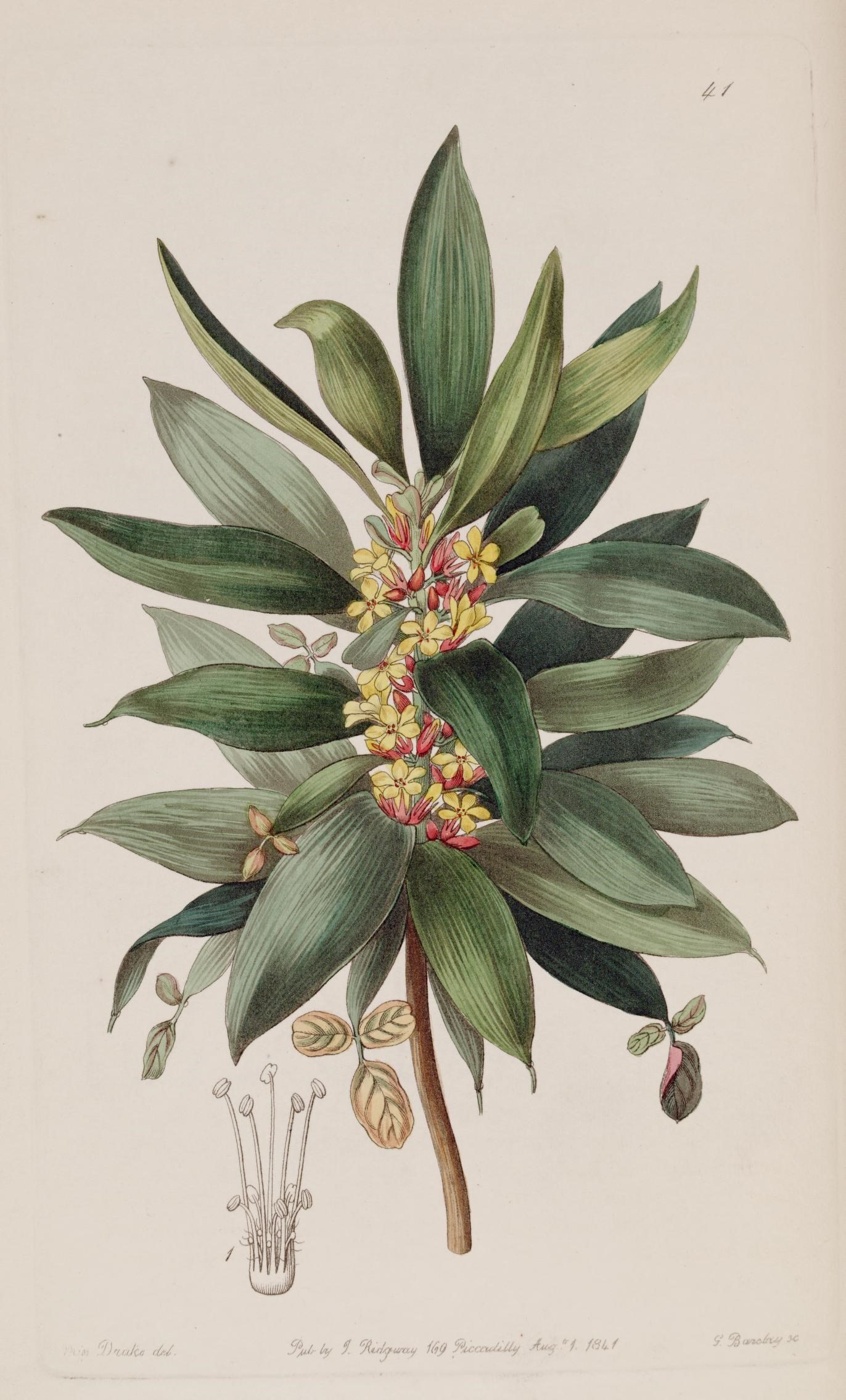

Scientific classification
- Kingdom: Plantae
- Clade: Tracheophytes
- Clade: Angiosperms
- Clade: Eudicots
- Clade: Rosids
- Order: Oxalidales
- Family: Oxalidaceae
- Genus: Oxalis
- Species: O. fruticosa

Binomial name
- Oxalis fruticosa Raddi

Synonyms
- Acetosella bupleurifolia (A. St.-Hil.) Kuntze; Acetosella nervosa (Vell.) Kuntze; Acetosella rusciformis (J. C. Mikan) Kuntze; Oxalis bupleurifolia A. St.-Hil.; Oxalis conferta Pohl ex Progel; Oxalis nervosa Vell.; Oxalis riedelii Norlind; Oxalis rusciformis J. C. Mikan; Acetosella daphniformis (J. C. Mikan ex Zucc.) Kuntze; Oxalis daphniformis J. C. Mikan ex Zucc.

= Oxalis fruticosa =

Species of shrubs in the wood sorrel family

Oxalis fruticosa is a species of shrub in the family Oxalidaceae. It is native to eastern Brazil. Unlike most other wood sorrels, it has a woody stem and broad, lanceolate, leaf-like blades. The leaf-like structures originate as leaf stalks with three leaflets that later fall off.

Two subspecies are recognized: the nominate O. fruticosa subsp. fructicosa, and O. fruticosa subsp. daphniformis.
