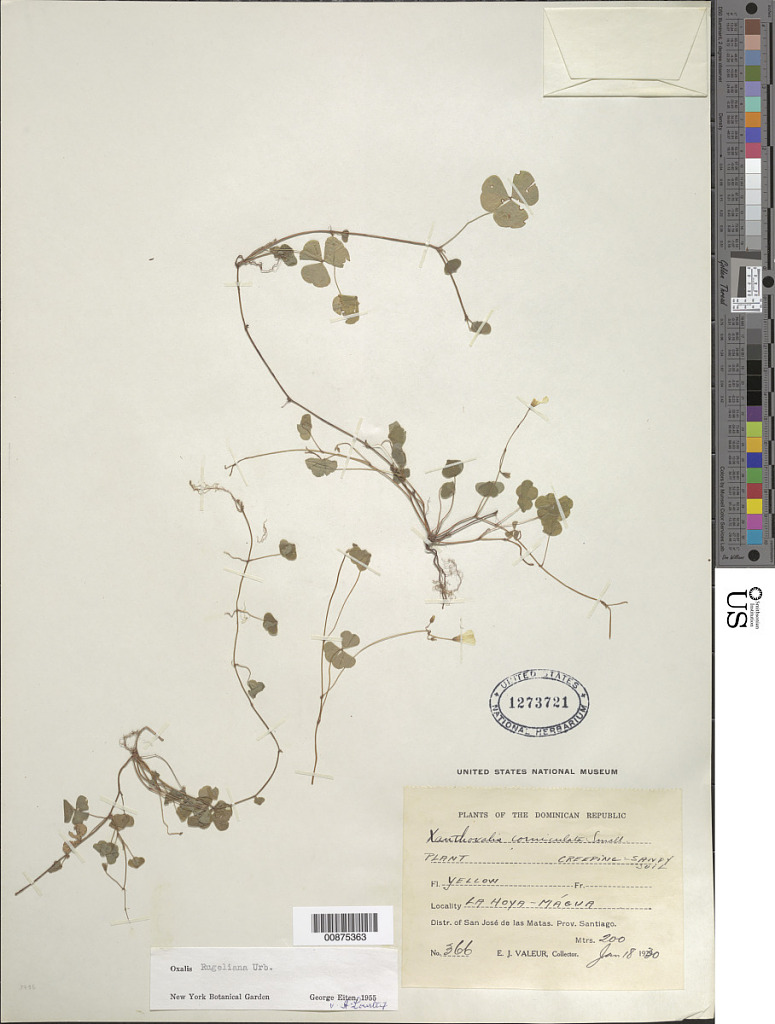
- Pressed specimen

Scientific classification
- Kingdom: Plantae
- Clade: Tracheophytes
- Clade: Angiosperms
- Clade: Eudicots
- Clade: Rosids
- Order: Oxalidales
- Family: Oxalidaceae
- Genus: Oxalis
- Species: O. rugeliana

Binomial name
- Oxalis rugeliana Urb.

= Oxalis rugeliana =

Species of wood sorrel

Oxalis rugeliana is a species of wood sorrels from the Oxalidaceae family. It is found in Cuba, Dominican Republic, Haiti and Puerto Rico.

== Habitat ==
It resides in montane rain forests at low elevations.

== Taxonomy ==
It was first described in 1912 by German entomologist, Ignatz Urban as Oxalis domingensis. However, in 1943, its status as a separate species was rescinded and considered to be a variety of Oxalis corniculata – i.e.: Oxalis corniculata var. domingensis. Since 2012, it has been restored back to its previous status of being a separate species.
