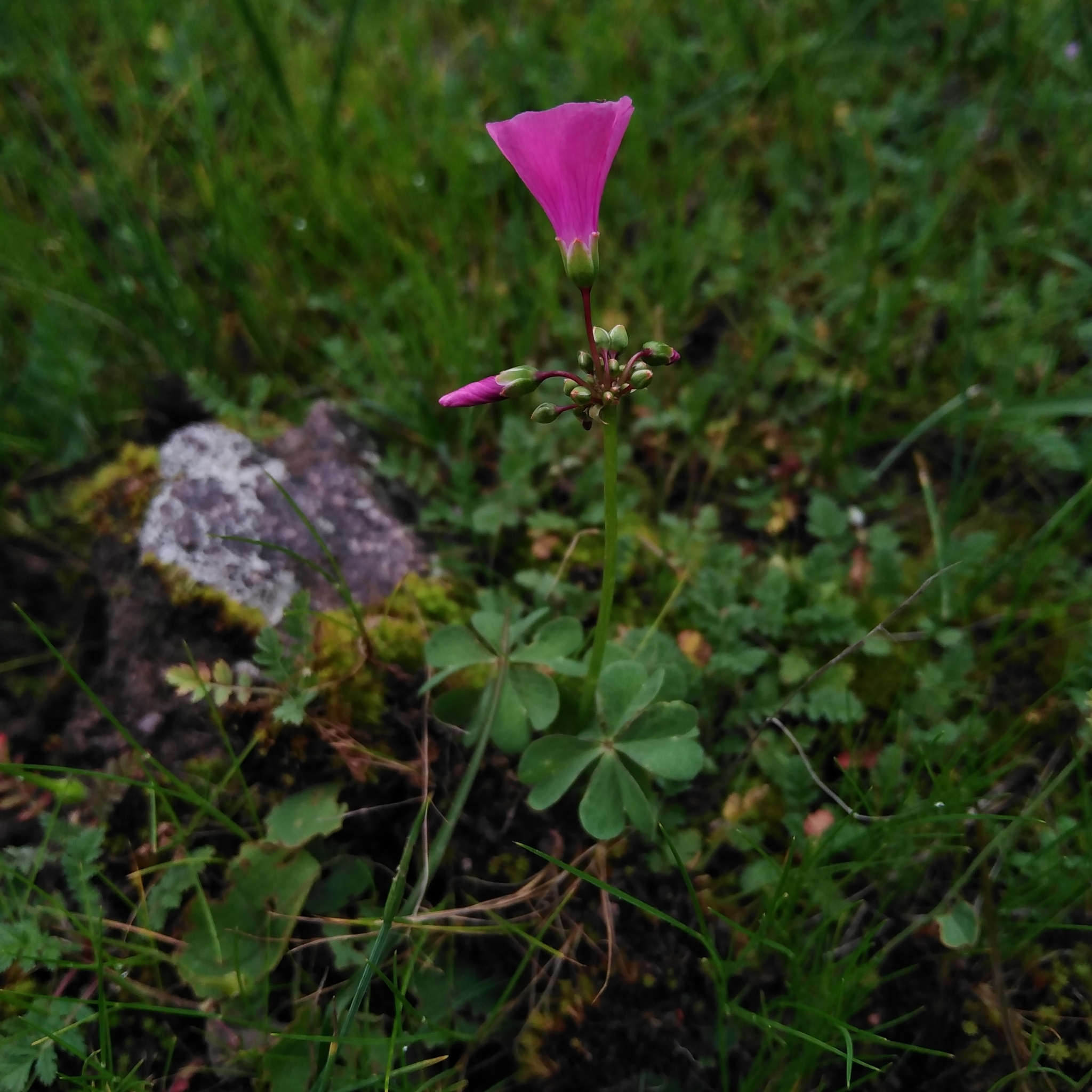

Scientific classification
- Kingdom: Plantae
- Clade: Tracheophytes
- Clade: Angiosperms
- Clade: Eudicots
- Clade: Rosids
- Order: Oxalidales
- Family: Oxalidaceae
- Genus: Oxalis
- Species: O. arenaria

Binomial name
- Oxalis arenaria Bertero

= Oxalis arenaria =

Species of wood sorrel

Oxalis arenaria is a species of flowering plant in the family Oxalidaceae. It is endemic to Chile, where it is distributed from the Coquimbo to the Magallanes regions.
