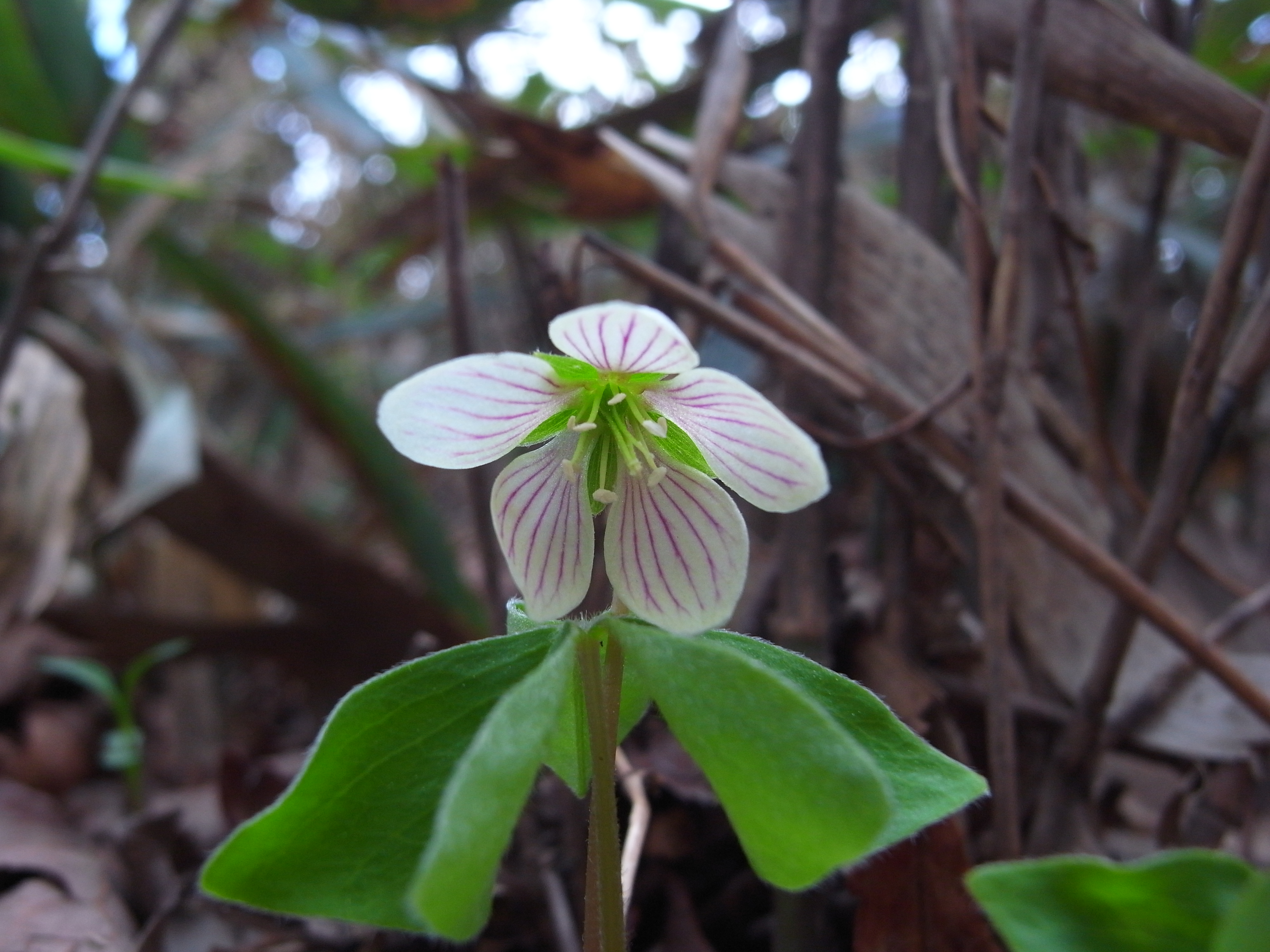

Scientific classification
- Kingdom: Plantae
- Clade: Tracheophytes
- Clade: Angiosperms
- Clade: Eudicots
- Clade: Rosids
- Order: Oxalidales
- Family: Oxalidaceae
- Genus: Oxalis
- Species: O. obtriangulata

Binomial name
- Oxalis obtriangulata Maxim.

Synonyms
- Acetosella obtriangulata (Maxim.) Kuntze

= Oxalis obtriangulata =

Species of plant

Oxalis obtriangulata is a species of flowering plant in the genus Oxalis. It is native to the forests of northern Japan, Korea, and far east Russia.

== Description ==
It is a perennial herb and grows 15–20 cm (5.9–7.9 in) high. It grows white flowers with several thin red-violet stripes on each petal. It blossoms in May.

== Distribution and habitat ==
The plant typically grows in forests and shady places at altitudes of 700–1,500 m (2,300–4,900 ft).
