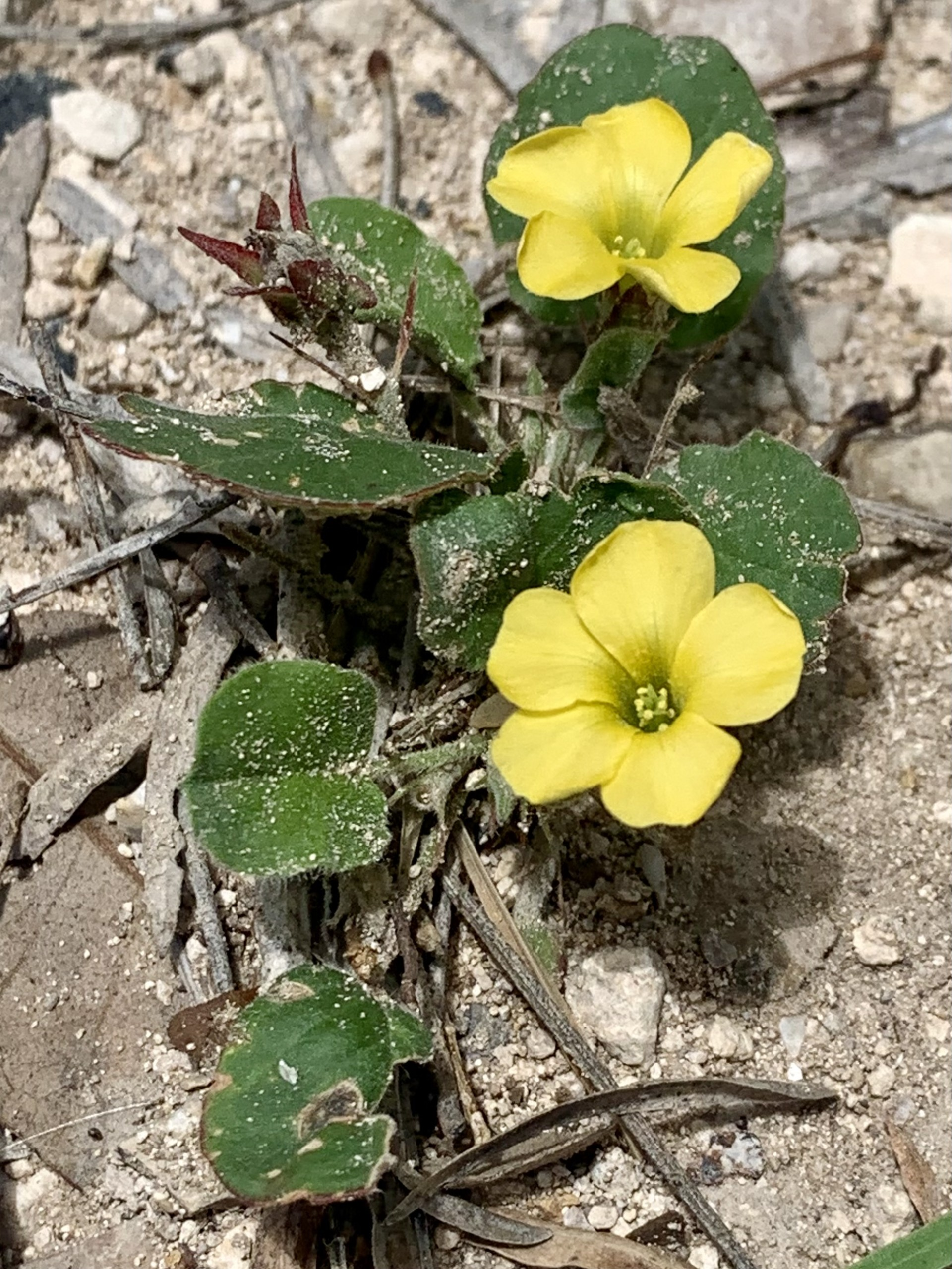

Scientific classification
- Kingdom: Plantae
- Clade: Embryophytes
- Clade: Tracheophytes
- Clade: Spermatophytes
- Clade: Angiosperms
- Clade: Eudicots
- Clade: Rosids
- Order: Oxalidales
- Family: Oxalidaceae
- Genus: Oxalis
- Species: O. dichondrifolia

Binomial name
- Oxalis dichondrifolia A. Gray

Synonyms
- Acetosella dichondrifolia (A.Gray) Kuntze; Monoxalis dichondraefolia (A.Gray) Small; Oxalis villosa G.Don

= Oxalis dichondrifolia =

Species of flowering plant

Oxalis dichondrifolia, also known as peonyleaf woodsorrel or agrito, is a perennial herbaceous plant in the family Oxalidaceae.

It was described in 1852.

== Description ==
Oxalis dichondrifolia is small herbaceous forb that grows up to 1 foot tall. Plants have 1–3 stems with stems and leaves finely hirsute. Leaves are suborbiculate to oblong-obovate or ovate, alternate, and simple differing from most members of the genus, which typically have palmately compound leaves with three leaflets. Flowers of O. dichondrifolia have five petals with the colors ranging from white to yellow to yellow-orange, though they are most commonly yellow. Flowers are bisexual and exhibit heterostyly, similar to most species in the family. Fruit is a capsule or caryopsis.

== Phenology ==
Oxalis dichondrifolia is perennial with flowering occurring primarily from February to June, but may bloom throughout the year.

== Habitat ==
Oxalis dichondrifolia grows in chapparal, sandy, or dune environments, preferring an open canopy.

== Range ==
Oxalis dichondrifolia is native to Texas (commonly found in South Texas and rarely in the Texas Coastal Plains) and Mexico (Coahuila, Nuevo León, San Luis Potosí, Tamaulipas, Veracruz).
