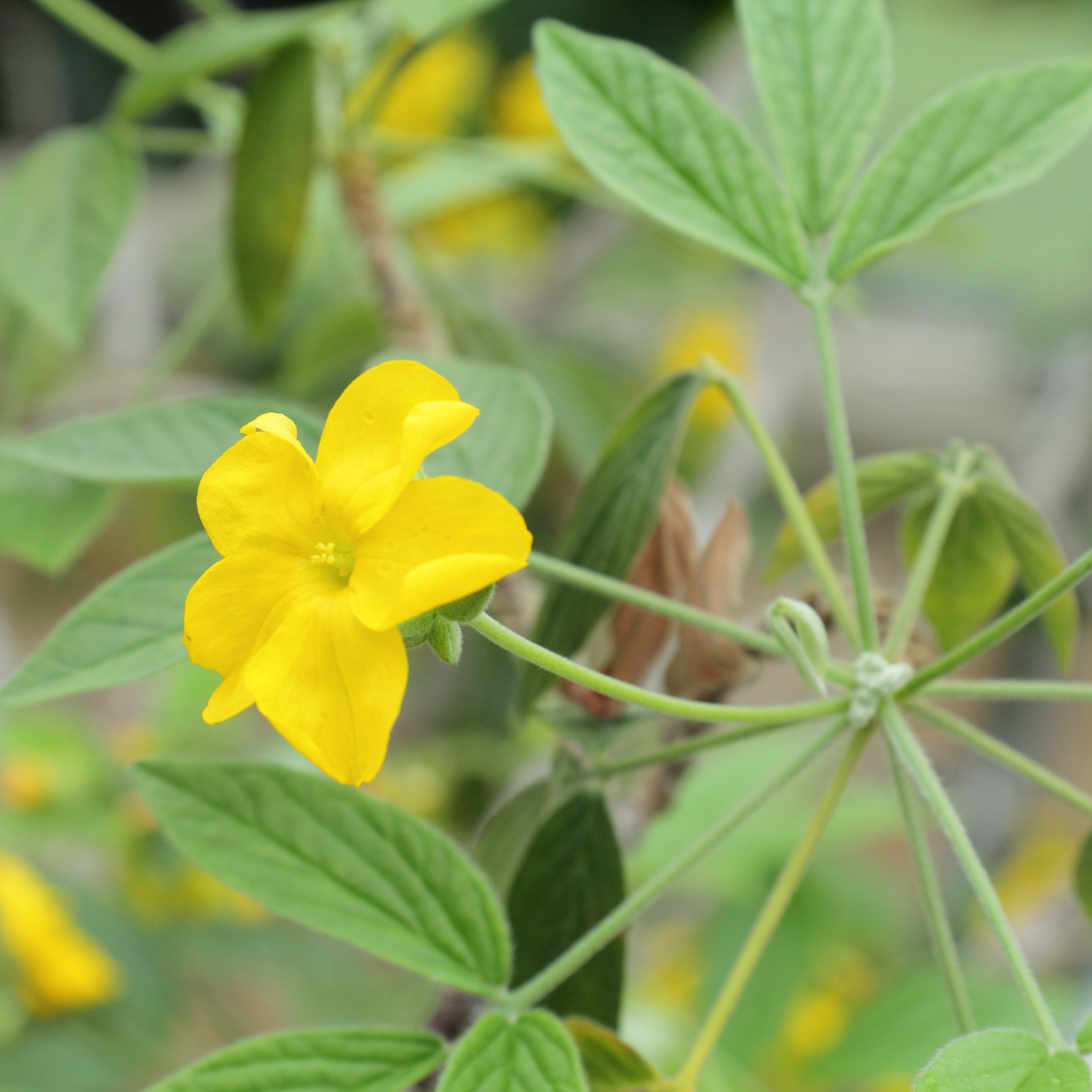

Scientific classification
- Kingdom: Plantae
- Clade: Tracheophytes
- Clade: Angiosperms
- Clade: Eudicots
- Clade: Rosids
- Order: Oxalidales
- Family: Oxalidaceae
- Genus: Oxalis
- Species: O. psoraleoides

Binomial name
- Oxalis psoraleoides Kunth

Synonyms
- Acetosella psoralioides (Kunth) Kuntze; Acetosella psoralodes Kuntze; Oxalis dispar N.E.Br.; Oxalis insipida A.St.-Hil.; Oxalis lutzelburgii R.Knuth; Oxalis psoralioides Kunth

= Oxalis psoraleoides =

Species of flowering plant

Oxalis psoraleoides is a species of flowering plant in the family Oxalidaceae that is native to Ecuador, Peru, Bolivia, Paraguay, Argentina and Brazil. Carl Sigismund Kunth described the species in 1821. Plants of this species of wood sorrel are perennial, hairy shrubs with large, yellow flowers, leaves with three leaflets, and one-seeded capsules. O. psoraleoides is diploid with a large genome size, and is classified within Oxalis section Psoraleoideae in subgenus Thamnoxys.

== Taxonomy ==
Oxalis psoraleoides is in the plant family Oxalidaceae. It was first described by German botanist Carl Sigismund Kunth in 1821 as O. psoralioides which was later corrected to O. psoraleoides. In 1824 Dr J. G. Zuccarini repeated the original description by Kunth but spelt the species name O. psoraleoides. The name O. psoraleoides Mart. is not the correct name for this species.

The holotype specimen was collected by Alexander von Humboldt and Aimé Bonpland at Guamani, Ecuador (the original description says "Santa Fe de Bogotá ?"), and is housed at the herbarium at the National Museum of Natural History, France (P00679820). There is also an isotype at the same herbarium.

Other synonyms of the name include Acetosella psoralidoides, Oxalis dispar, and O. lutzelburgii, among others.

Oxalis psoraleoides belongs to Oxalis subgenus Thamnoxys. It is one of about 80 mainly tropical South American species in this subgenus, which are herbs or shrubs with 1–3-foliolate pinnate leaves. Of the nine sections in this subgenus, O. psoraleoides belongs to section Psoraleoideae.

Two allopatric subspecies of O. psoraleoides are recognized:

- Oxalis psoraleoides Kunth subsp. psoraleoides
- Oxalis psoraleoides subsp. insipida (A.St.-Hil.) Lourteig

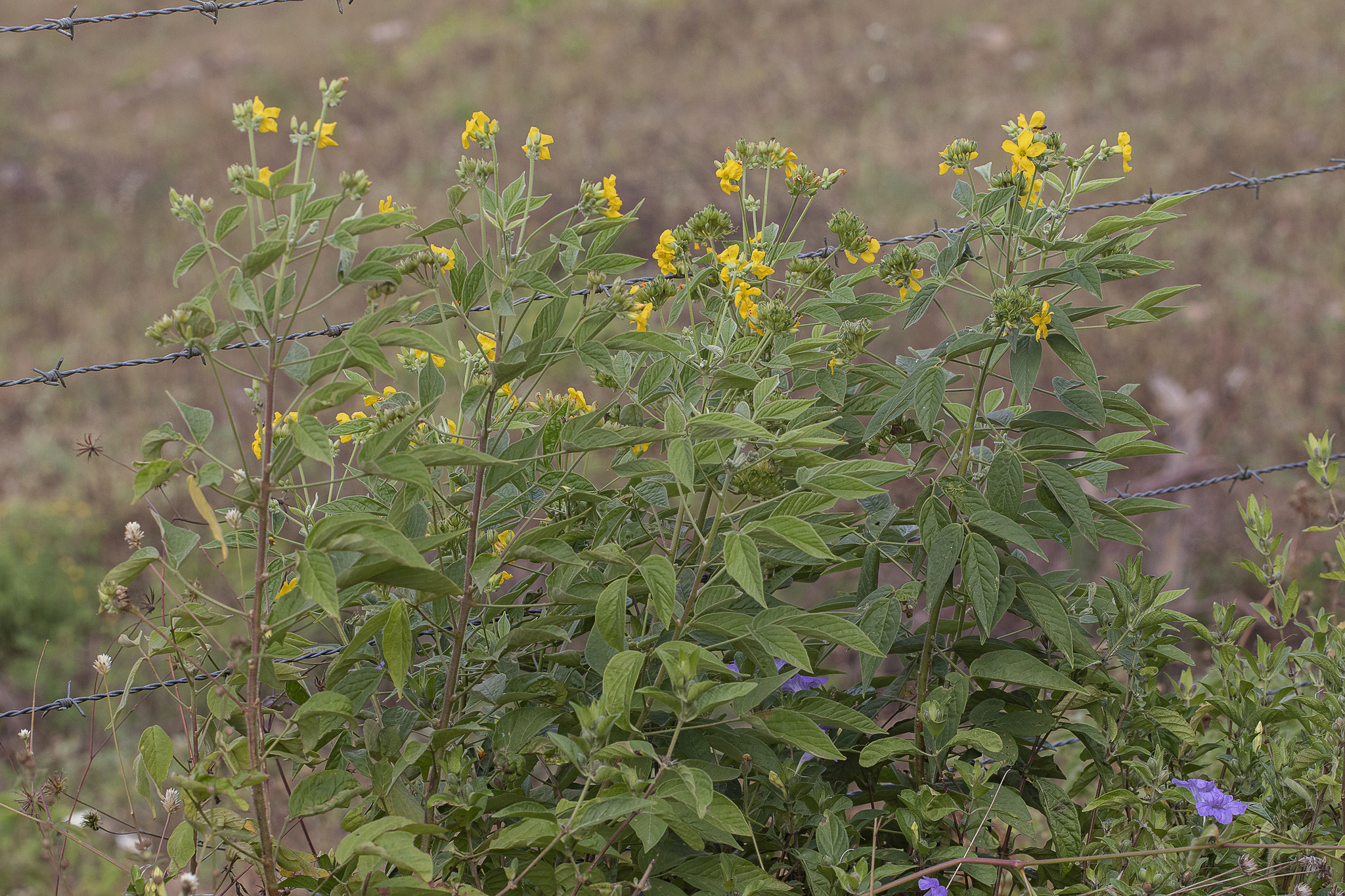

The subspecies can be distinguished by their leaf shape, the hairs on the leaves, and sepals. They are also allopatric (geographically separated), with subsp. psoraleoides found in Ecuador and Peru, and subsp. insipida found in Brazil, Paraguay, Bolivia and Argentina.

== Description ==
Oxalis psoraleoides is a hairy shrub up to 2 m tall and woody stems up to 1 cm in diameter. Leaves have three leaflets, with the center leaflet larger than the other two, and a long petiole up to 11 cm). The leaf blade is obovate or oblong, 1.5–6 cm long by 1–4 cm wide, and hairy on both sides. The inflorescence is a cyme with up to 50 actinomorphic (regular) flowers with five yellow petals, each up to 1.5 cm long. The fruit is a hairy subglobose capsule with one seed.

In a study based in the municipalities of Recôncavo Baiano, in Bahia, Brazil, the species was noted to be flowering in January, February and May, and was one of 240 species visited by the honeybee, Apis mellifera. In another field study, the hummingbird Chlorostilbon lucidus visited plants of O. psoraleoides in the Serra do Pará mountains in Pernambuco, Brazil.

== Distribution and habitat ==
Oxalis psoraleoides is native to Ecuador, Peru, Bolivia, Paraguay, Argentina and Brazil.

It is found in South American seasonally dry tropical forest habitats including the dry scrub forest of Ecuador and the Caatinga in Brazil, from 300 to 2500 m above sea level.

== Cytology and phylogeny ==
Oxalis psoraleoides is a diploid (2n = 12) with large chromosomes and a large genome size (mean 41.88 pg).

Oxalis psoraleoides has been included in several phylogenetic analyses of Oxalis using the standard DNA sequencing markers including the nuclear ribosomal DNA internal transcribed spacer (ITS) and chloroplast DNA regions. In one study, the sampled individual of O. psoraleoides was sister with high support to the other sampled species (also a diploid) from Oxalis subgenus Thamnoxys, O. rhombeo-ovata. In a subsequent study, the three individuals of Oxalis psoraleoides subsp. insipida were monophyletic with moderate to high support, and this clade was sister to O. erosa, another diploid species in section Psoraleoideae, from seasonally dry tropical forests.

== Uses ==
In semi-arid areas of Pernambuco, Brazil, O. psoraleoides (as O. insipida) is known as chumbinho and is used as a food source, whereas in Peru it has been listed as an antimalarial medicine.

== Gallery ==
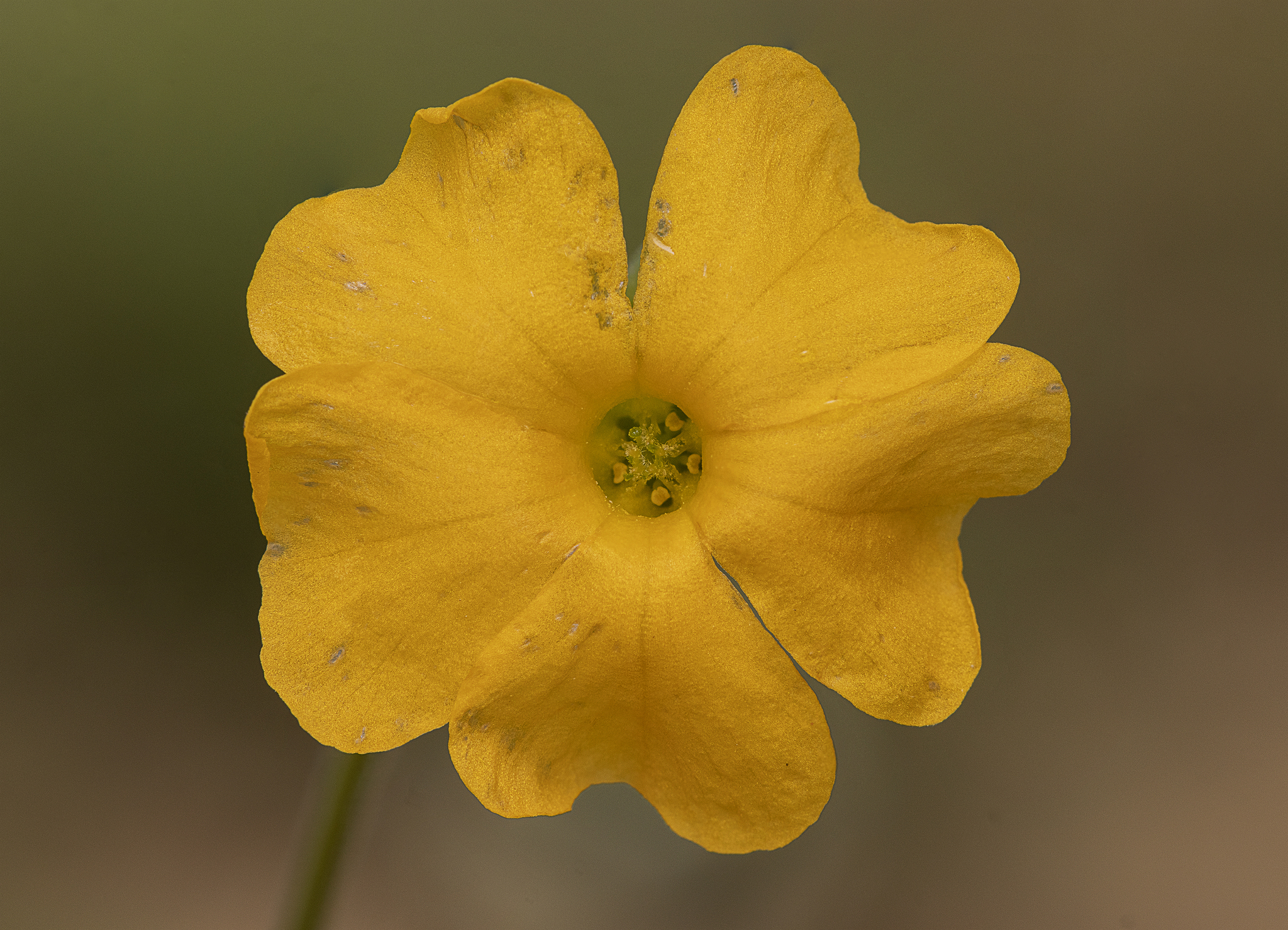

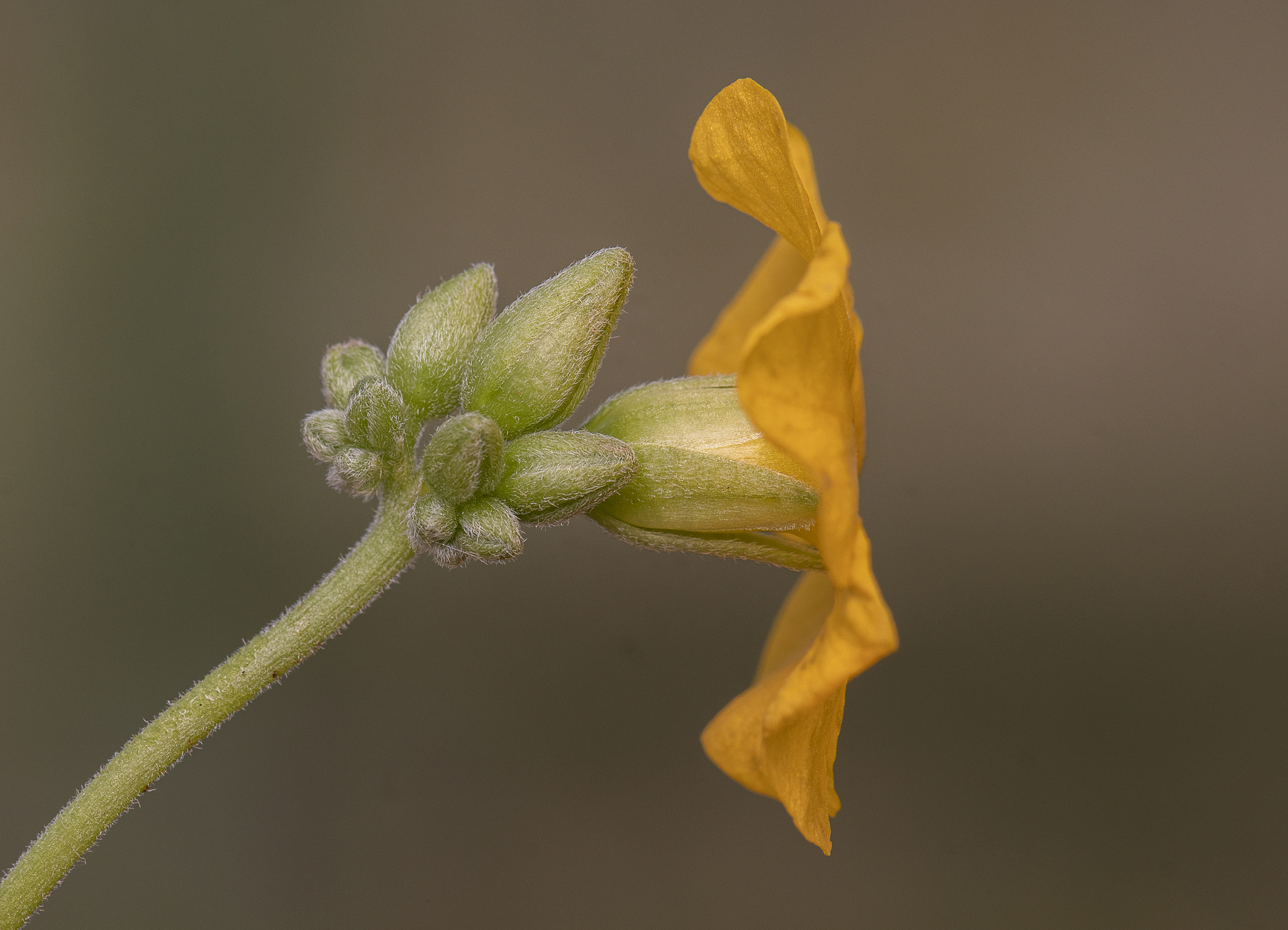

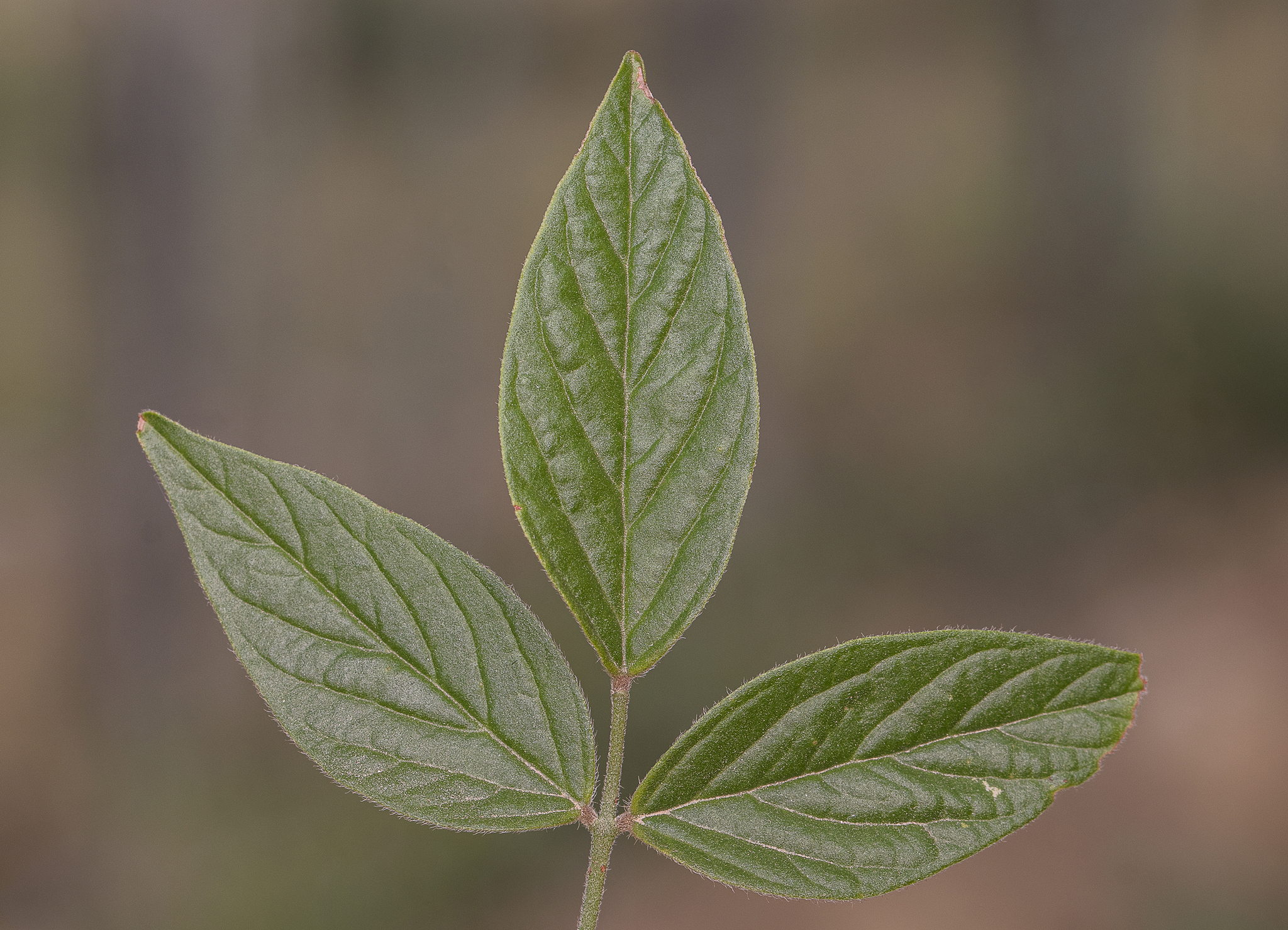
