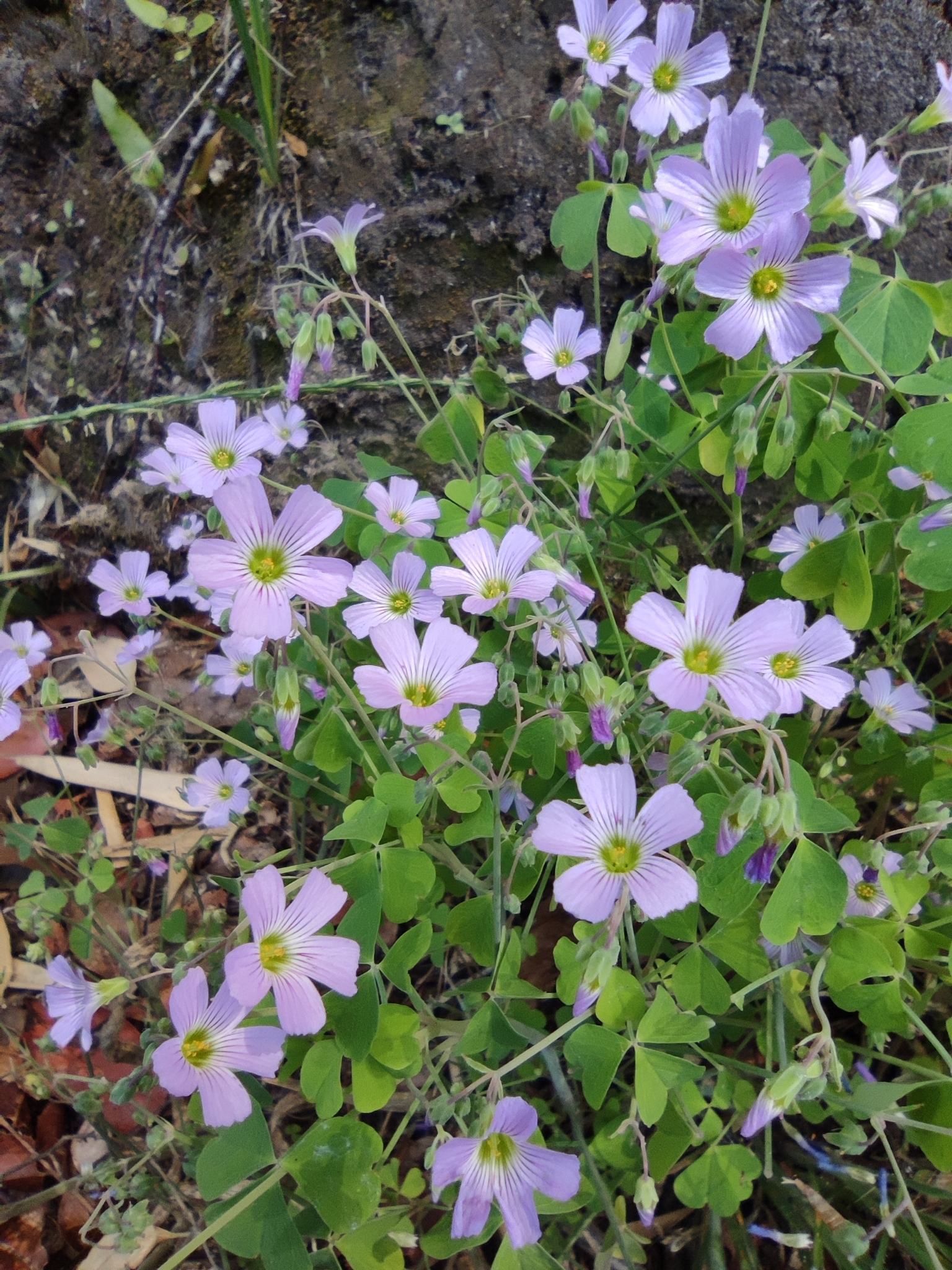
- In Mariquina, Los Ríos Region, Chile

Scientific classification
- Kingdom: Plantae
- Clade: Tracheophytes
- Clade: Angiosperms
- Clade: Eudicots
- Clade: Rosids
- Order: Oxalidales
- Family: Oxalidaceae
- Genus: Oxalis
- Species: O. rosea

Binomial name
- Oxalis rosea Jacq.

= Oxalis rosea =

Species of plant

Oxalis rosea, the Culle colorado, is a species of flowering plant in the family Oxalidaceae. It is one of the nearly 30 Oxalis species endemic to Chile. It is an annual herb distributed from the Coquimbo to the Aysen regions. It is reported as an introduced species in France, Great Britain and Romania. It has also been introduced to Ireland.
