= Oxalis laciniata =

Scientific classification
- Kingdom: Plantae
- Clade: Tracheophytes
- Clade: Angiosperms
- Clade: Eudicots
- Clade: Rosids
- Order: Oxalidales
- Family: Oxalidaceae
- Genus: Oxalis
- Species: O. laciniata

Binomial name
- Oxalis laciniata Cav.

Synonyms
- Acetosella laciniata (Cav.) Kuntze; Acetosella squammosoradiata (Steud.) Kuntze; Oxalis laciniata var. pubescens (Skottsb.) J.M.H.Shaw; Oxalis prichardii Rendle; Oxalis squamosoradicosa Steud.; Oxalis squamosoradicosa var. pubescens Skottsb.

Species of plant

Oxalis laciniata, the cut-leaved sorrel, is a species of flowering plant in the family Oxalidaceae. It is native to Patagonia; southern Chile and southern Argentina. A colony-forming, deciduous rhizomatous geophyte reaching 5 cm (2 in) tall and 50 cm (20 in) wide, it is found growing on sandy or stony slopes at elevations from 0 to 200 m (0 to 660 ft). With its wavy leaves and fragrant indigo-colored flowers, it has gained the Royal Horticultural Society's Award of Garden Merit as an "ideal" alpine rockery ornamental.
