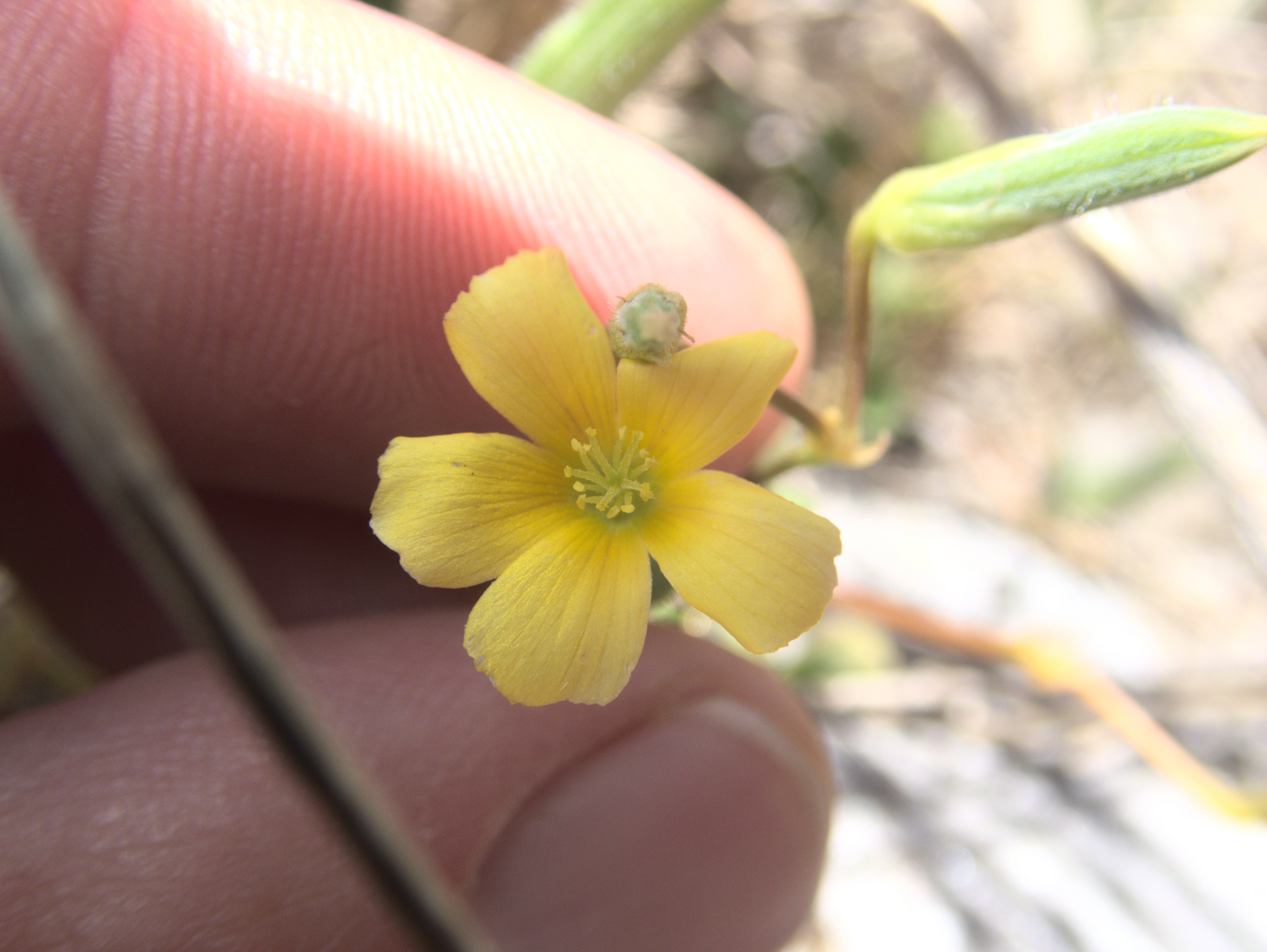

Scientific classification
- Kingdom: Plantae
- Clade: Tracheophytes
- Clade: Angiosperms
- Clade: Eudicots
- Clade: Rosids
- Order: Oxalidales
- Family: Oxalidaceae
- Genus: Oxalis
- Species: O. rubens

Binomial name
- Oxalis rubens Haw.

= Oxalis rubens =

Species of flowering plant

Oxalis rubens is a small herbaceous plant found in coastal areas of Australia and New Zealand. Branches are erect or ascending, up to 35 cm long, of a dull red-brown colour. The specific epithet rubens is derived from Latin, meaning reddish in colour.
