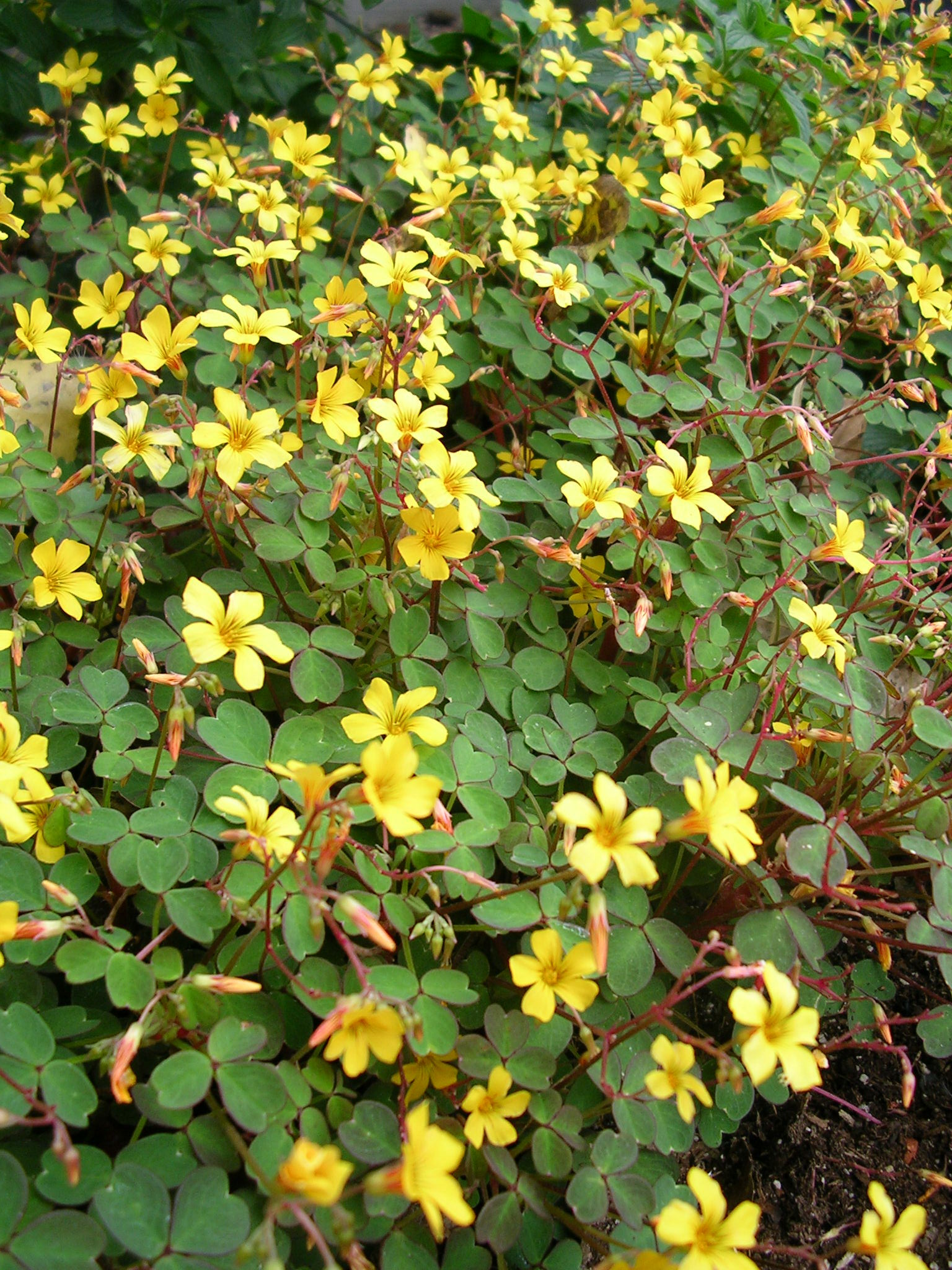

Scientific classification
- Kingdom: Plantae
- Clade: Tracheophytes
- Clade: Angiosperms
- Clade: Eudicots
- Clade: Rosids
- Order: Oxalidales
- Family: Oxalidaceae
- Genus: Oxalis
- Species: O. spiralis

Binomial name
- Oxalis spiralis G.Don

Synonyms
- Oxalis vulcanicola Donn.Sm., 1897

= Oxalis spiralis =

Species of flowering plant

Oxalis spiralis, the spiral sorrel, is a species of plant of the genus Oxalis, a member of the wood sorrel family Oxalidaceae.

== Taxonomy ==
The following subspecies are accepted:

- Oxalis spiralis subsp. spiralis
- Oxalis spiralis subsp. membranifolia (R.Knuth) Lourteig
- Oxalis spiralis subsp. trichophora Lourteig
- Oxalis spiralis subsp. vulcanicola (Donn.Sm.) Lourteig – volcanic sorrel, velvet oxalis

== Distribution ==
Oxalis spiralis is native to Central America and western South America.

== Cultivation ==
Spiral sorrel is cultivated for its ornamental value. Several cultivars of Oxalis spiralis subsp. vulcanicola are available, including:

- O. spiralis subsp. vulcanicola 'Aureus' – bright yellow-green foliage
- O. spiralis subsp. vulcanicola 'Molten Lava' – bright yellow-green and copper-red foliage
- O. spiralis subsp. vulcanicola 'Zinfandel' – dark purple, nearly black foliage
- O. spiralis subsp. vulcanicola 'Plum Crazy' – dark purple foliage, randomly variegated

== Gallery ==
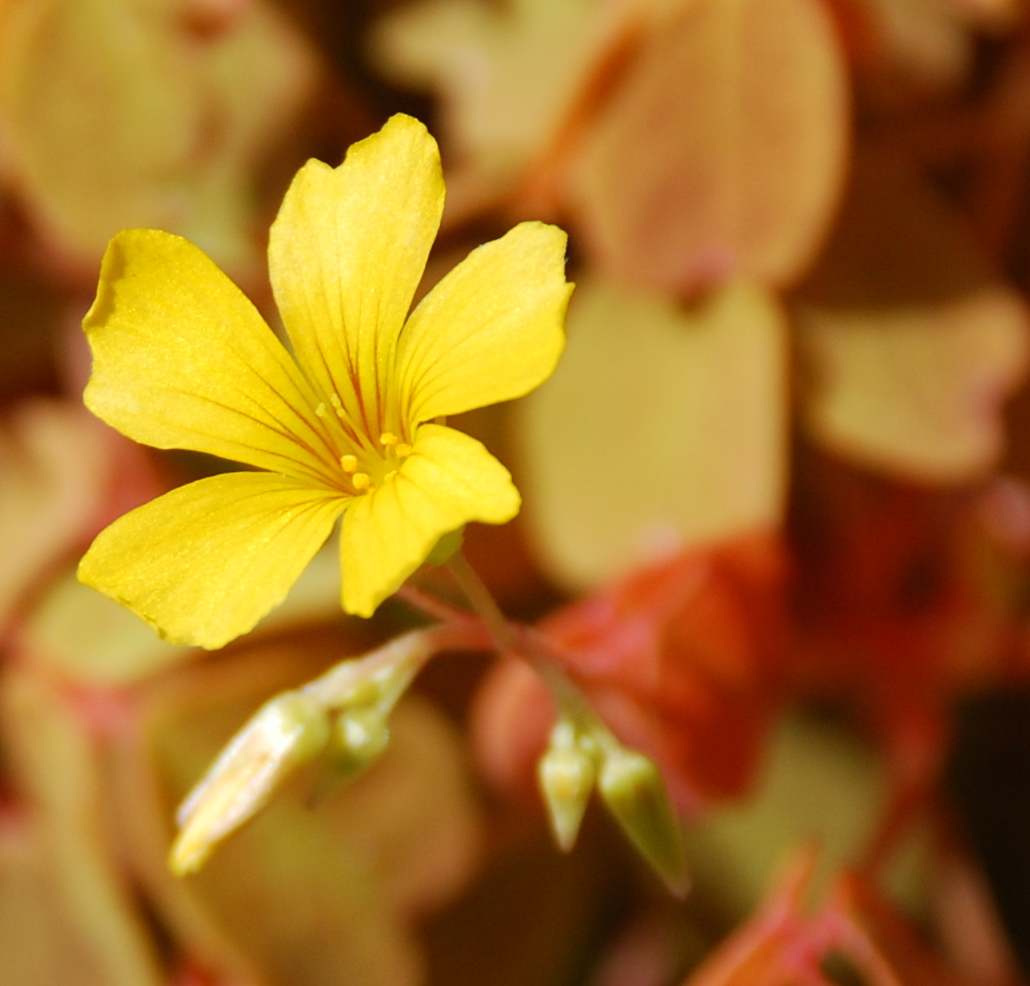
Flower

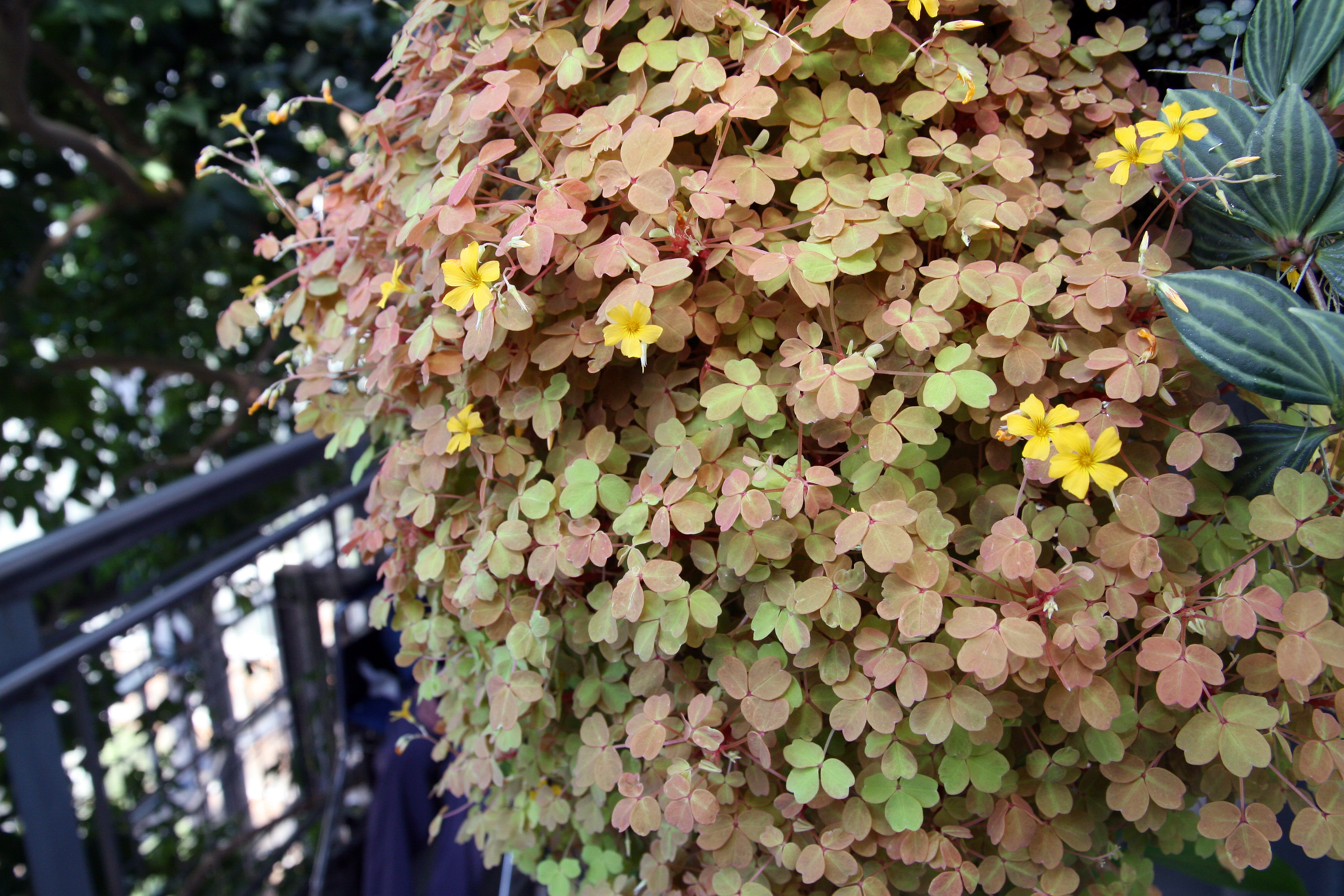
Growth habit in a planter

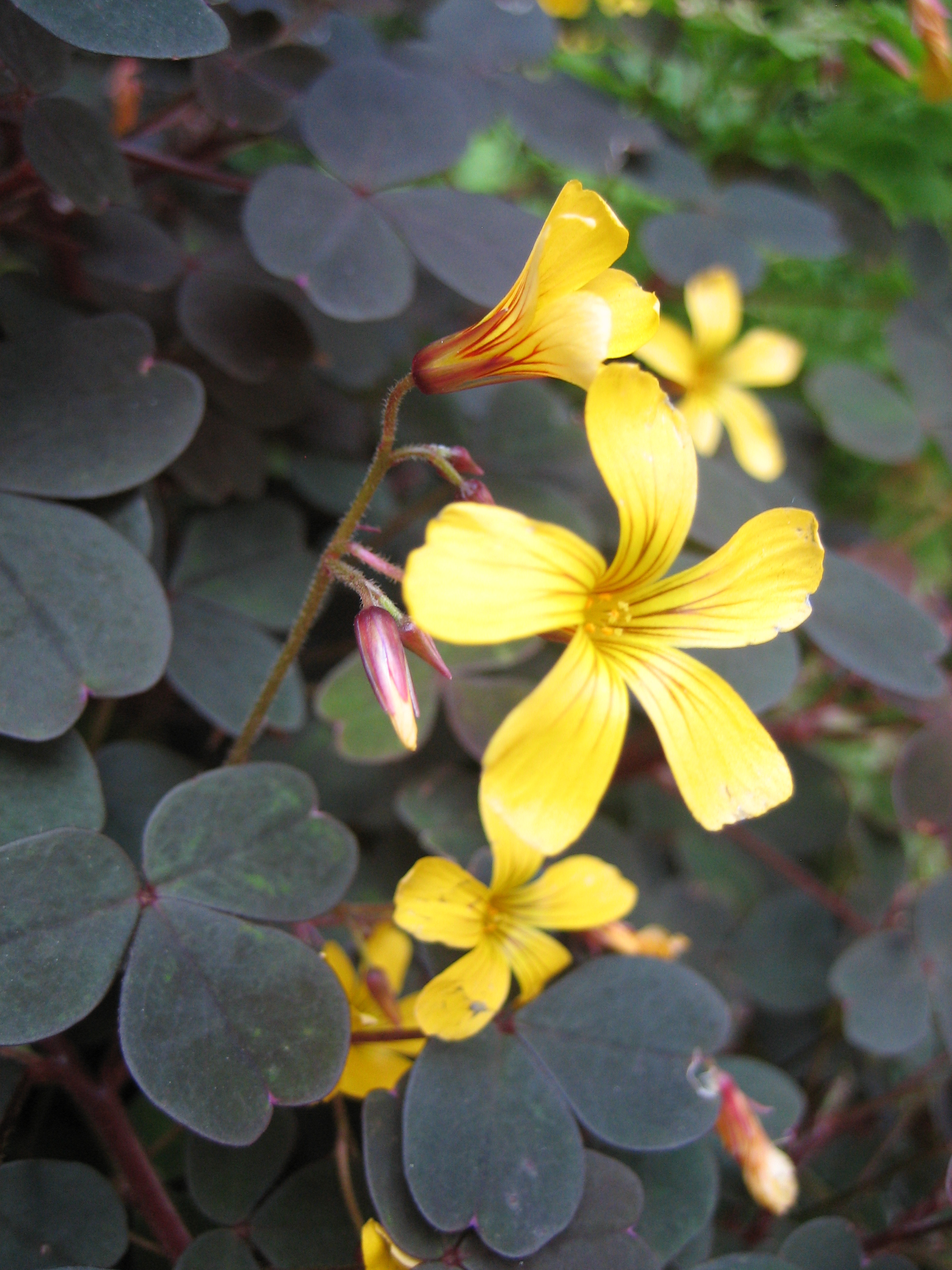
'Zinfandel'
