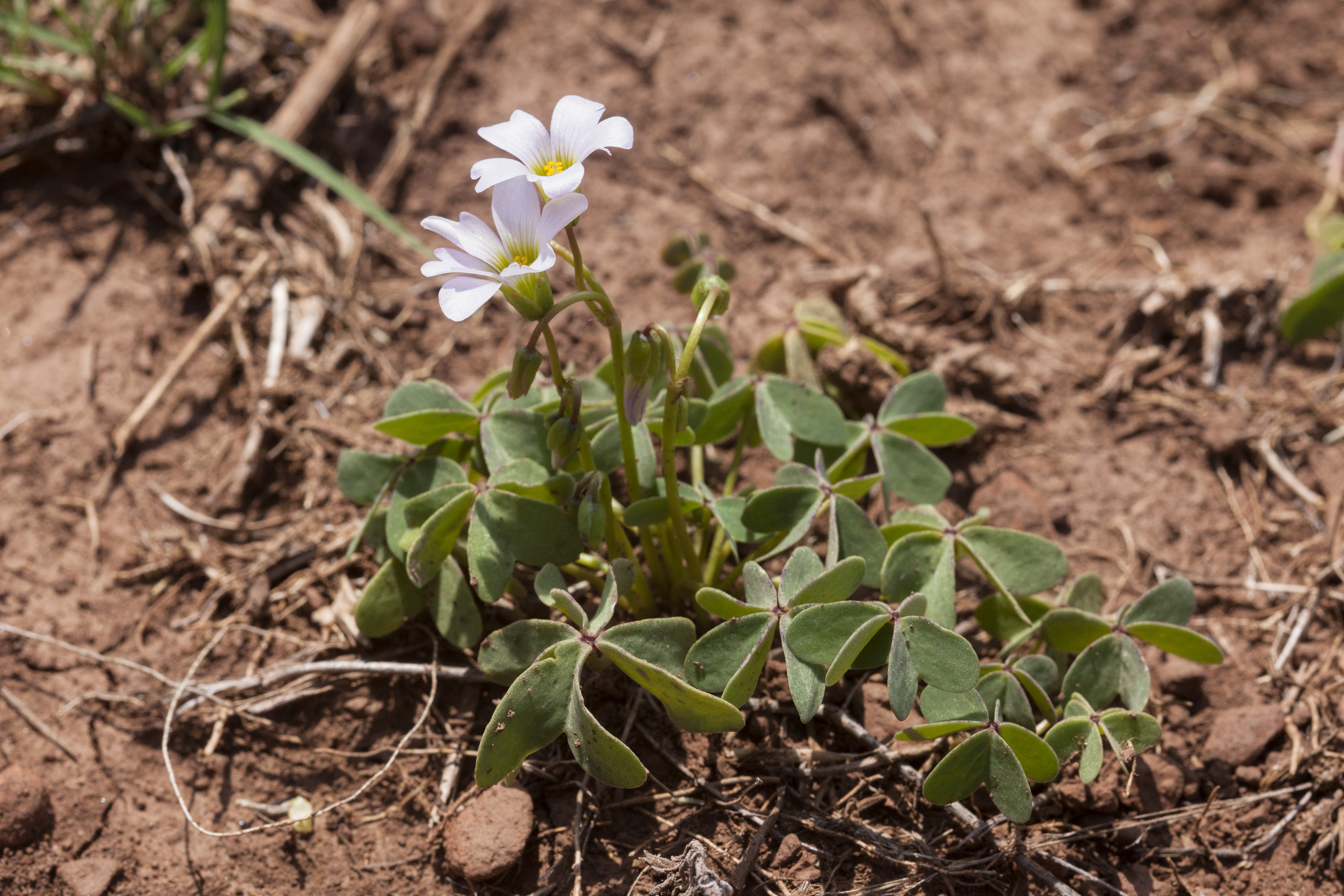
- In Gila National Forest, New Mexico

Conservation status
- Apparently Secure (NatureServe)

Scientific classification
- Kingdom: Plantae
- Clade: Tracheophytes
- Clade: Angiosperms
- Clade: Eudicots
- Clade: Rosids
- Order: Oxalidales
- Family: Oxalidaceae
- Genus: Oxalis
- Species: O. c. (Small)

Binomial name
- Oxalis caerulea (Small) (Small) R.Knuth

Synonyms
- Ionoxalis caerulea

= Oxalis caerulea =

Plant species in the wood-sorrel family

Oxalis caerulea, the blue woodsorrel, is a perennial plant and herb in the wood-sorrel family. It is native to the southwestern United States.

== Description ==
Blue woodsorrel is a perennial that grows from a single bulb and does not have rhizomes or stolons. The bulbs measure 8–1.5 millimeters long and only infrequently grow bulblets. The scales on the bulb can have three to seven lines, though usually five or more.

All the leaves are basal, growing directly from the base of the plant on individual leaf stems most often measuring 3–10 centimeters long, but on occasion reaching 13 cm. Each leaf is made up of three to five leaflets, though most frequently four.

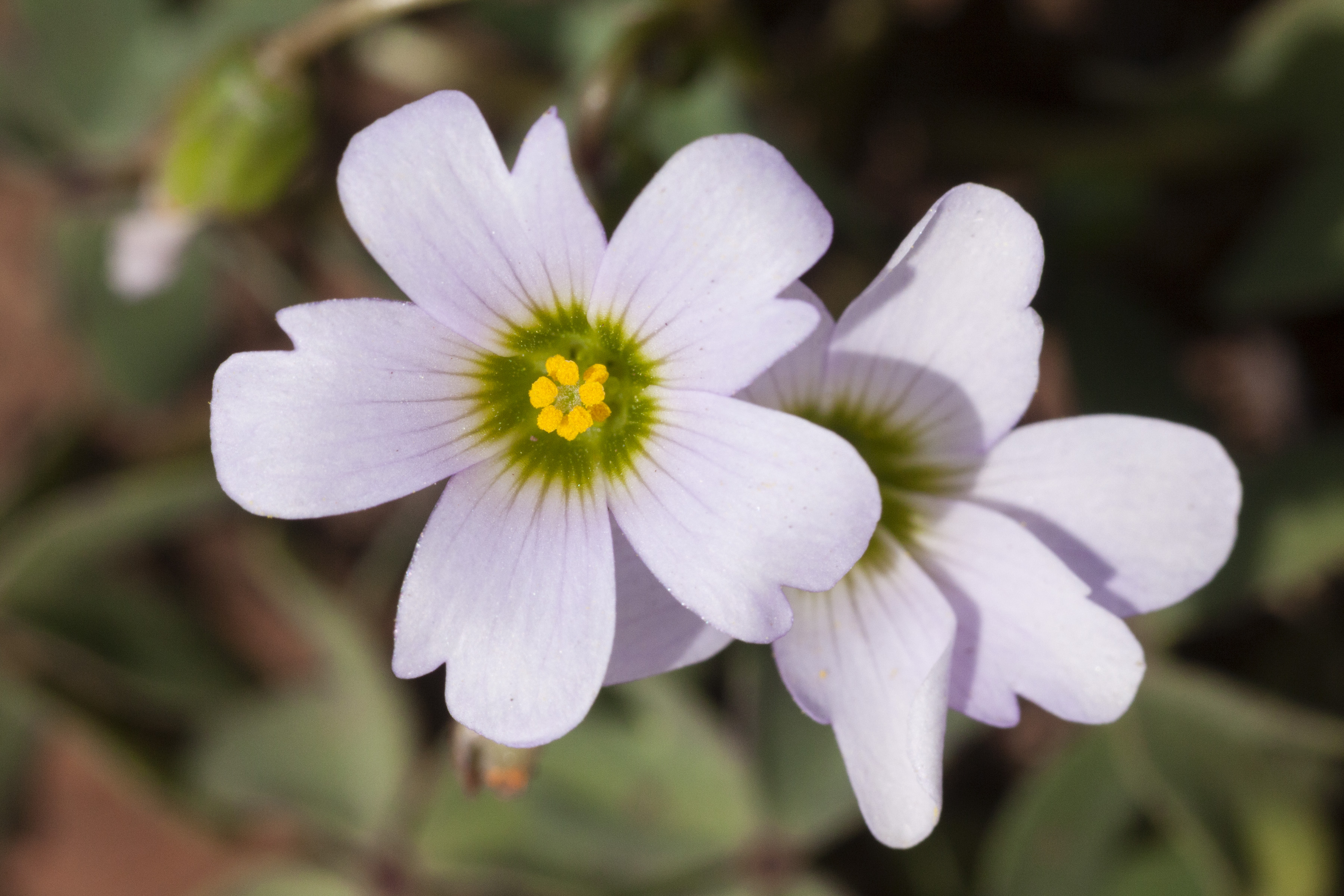
Flowers of blue woodsorrel

The inflorescence can have one to seven flowers, though at least two is frequent. The leafless flower stem is hairless and measures 6–15 centimeters tall. Each flower has five sepals and five petals, pink-lavender to rose-red in color. The petals measure 8–10 mm long. Flowering can occur anytime from June to September.

== Taxonomy ==
Oxalis caerulea was scientifically described in 1907 by John Kunkel Small, but named Ionoxalis caerulea. It was moved to the genus Oxalis by Reinhard Gustav Paul Knuth in 1919 giving the species its accepted name. Along with its genus it is classified in the family Oxalidaceae.

=== Names ===
The species name Oxalis caerulea means "blue" in Botanical Latin and it is likewise known as blue woodsorrel or blue wood-sorrel.

== Range and habitat ==
Blue woodsorrel grows in Colorado, Arizona, and New Mexico in the US and Chihuahua, Durango, and Sonora in Mexico. They are found at elevations of 1,800–2,600 meters (5,900–8,500 ft).

The species grows along streams and meadows in pinyon–juniper woodlands, pine–oak–juniper forests, and quaking aspens.
