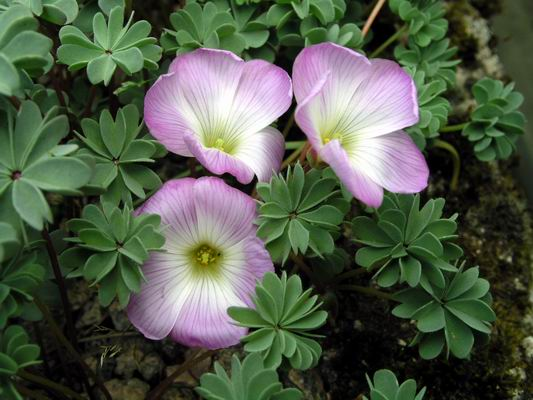

Scientific classification
- Kingdom: Plantae
- Clade: Embryophytes
- Clade: Tracheophytes
- Clade: Angiosperms
- Clade: Eudicots
- Clade: Rosids
- Order: Oxalidales
- Family: Oxalidaceae
- Genus: Oxalis
- Species: O. adenophylla

Binomial name
- Oxalis adenophylla L.

= Oxalis adenophylla =

Species of flowering plant

Oxalis adenophylla, commonly known as Chilean oxalis or silver shamrock (among other common names), is an Argentinian and Chilean alpine plant. In Chile, it is distributed between the Santiago Metropolitan Region and the Aysen Region. It is most notable for its leaves, which are palmately divided into as many as 22 leaflets, covered with silvery hairs. The light pink flowers are wider than the leaves.

== Cultivation ==
It is hardy in USDA hardiness zones 4–10. Outside of its native location, it is often used for rock gardens. It can also do well as a houseplant.

In the UK this plant has received the Royal Horticultural Society's Award of Garden Merit.

It does well in far-north locations such as Sweden, Norway and Nova Scotia (Canada), as well as in purely temperate regions. Its cold-hardiness comes from the bulb's adaptation to freezing during dormancy. It is, however, susceptible to rot in the winter in temperate zones, a problem not present where ground freezes in winter. It is tolerant of some shade, but will bloom most with full sunlight.

== Bibliography ==
- Sheader, Martin & Sheader, Anna-Liisa (2015). "Patagonian alpines". The Plantsman. New Series. 14 (1): 16–21.
