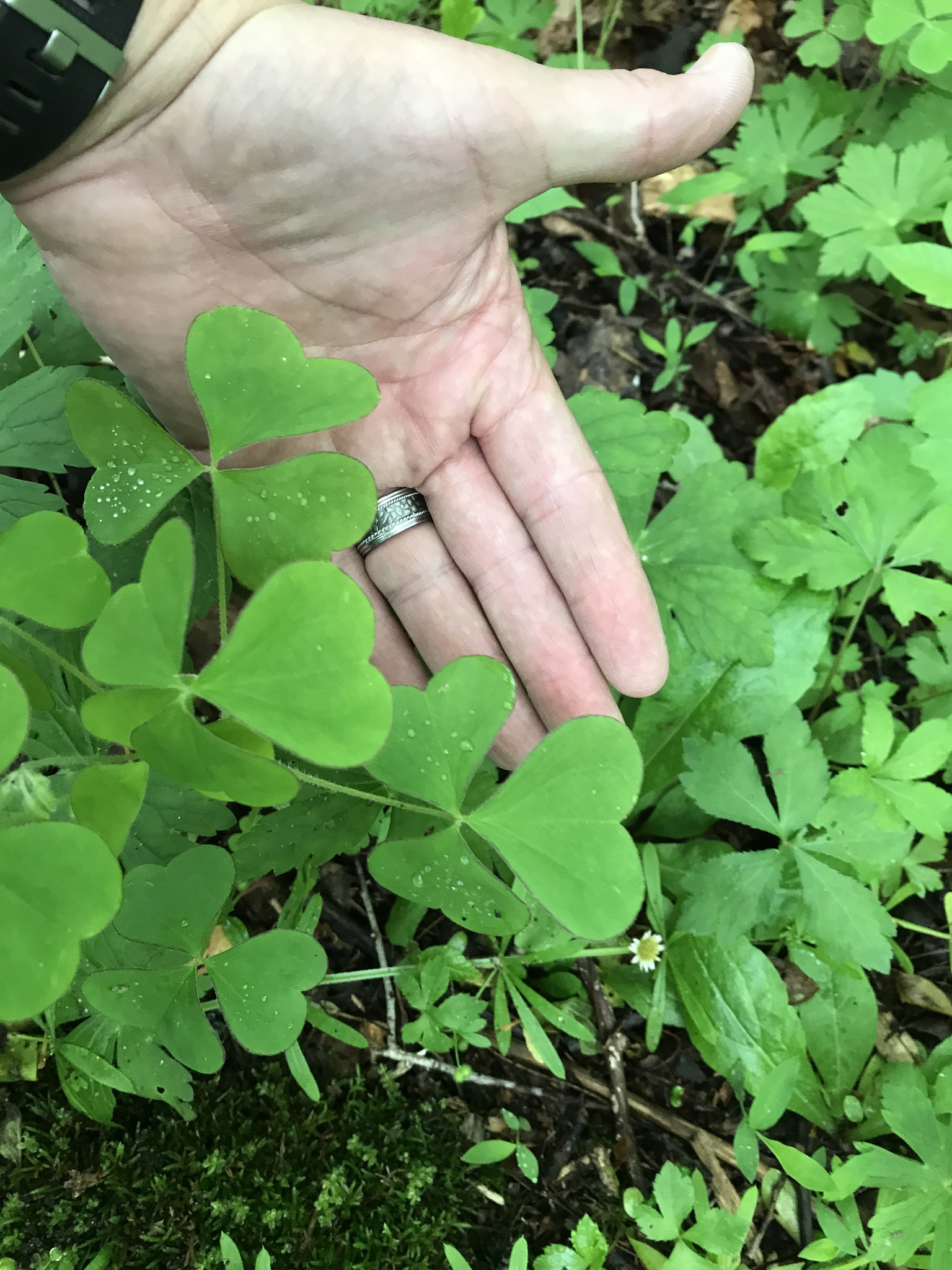

Scientific classification
- Kingdom: Plantae
- Clade: Tracheophytes
- Clade: Angiosperms
- Clade: Eudicots
- Clade: Rosids
- Order: Oxalidales
- Family: Oxalidaceae
- Genus: Oxalis
- Species: O. grandis

Binomial name
- Oxalis grandis Small 1894

Synonyms
- Oxalis recurva Trel. 1888, illegitimate homonym not Elliott 1821; Xanthoxalis grandis (Small) Small

= Oxalis grandis =

Species of flowering plant

Oxalis grandis, commonly known as great yellow woodsorrel or large yellow wood sorrel, is an annual plant and herb in the woodsorrel family. It is native to the eastern United States from Georgia north to Pennsylvania and Wisconsin, west as far as Louisiana. It blooms from May to June with yellow flowers and grows in sandy woods or alluvial soils.
