= Sheldon Independent School District =

Public school district in Texas

Address
- 11411 C.E. King Parkway Houston, Texas; USA (United States)

District information
- Type: Public
- Motto: A Community of Learners
- Grades: PK–12
- Established: 1952
- Accreditation: Met Standard
- Schools: 13
- NCES District ID: 4839990

Students and staff
- Students: 11,028 (2023–2024)
- Teachers: 658.19 (on an FTE basis) (2023–2024)
- Staff: 940.69 (on an FTE basis) (2023–2024)
- Student–teacher ratio: 16.76 (2023–2024)
- Athletic conference: 6A

Other information
- Website: www.sheldonisd.com

Sheldon Independent School District is a public school district in unincorporated northeast Harris County, Texas (USA). The majority of the district lies in the extraterritorial jurisdiction of Houston with a small portion within city limits.

Sheldon ISD covers 53.5 square miles and serves several neighborhoods in the Sheldon Lake area. Administration for the district is headquartered in the Dr. Donald Ney Administration Complex with Dr. King Davis acting as superintendent. Since the early 2000s, strong enrollment growth has driven new construction and expansions throughout the district. Nearly 7,800 students are enrolled in 2015.

The district and all of its schools were rated as having "Met Standard" in 2014 under the new Texas Education Agency accountability ratings.

== History ==
The Sheldon Independent School District became an independent school district in 1952.

=== District Growth ===
Sheldon ISD is the largest growing out of all ten counties in the Houston-Sugar Land-Baytown metropolitan area. From 2000 to 2010, district enrollment grew 61.5% and has annually averaged three to five percent growth since 2005. Annual enrollment growth rate change for the 2008–09 and 2009-10 school years was 6.8% and 5.9% respectively.

The construction of two major highways, US 90 (Crosby Freeway), and the Sam Houston Tollway, have been major drivers for growth. With easier access to the area, the district is expected to continue growing as new homes are built.

== Governance ==
- Superintendent: Dr. Demetrius McCall
- Athletic Director: Derek Fitzhenry

Sheldon I.S.D School Board Members:

- President: Eileen Palmer
- Vice President: Ed Lipscomb
- Secretary: Ken Coleman

Additional members include: Debbie Kolacny, Leticia Charlot, Fred Rivas, Keith Norwood.

== SISD Coverage Area ==
=== Boundaries ===
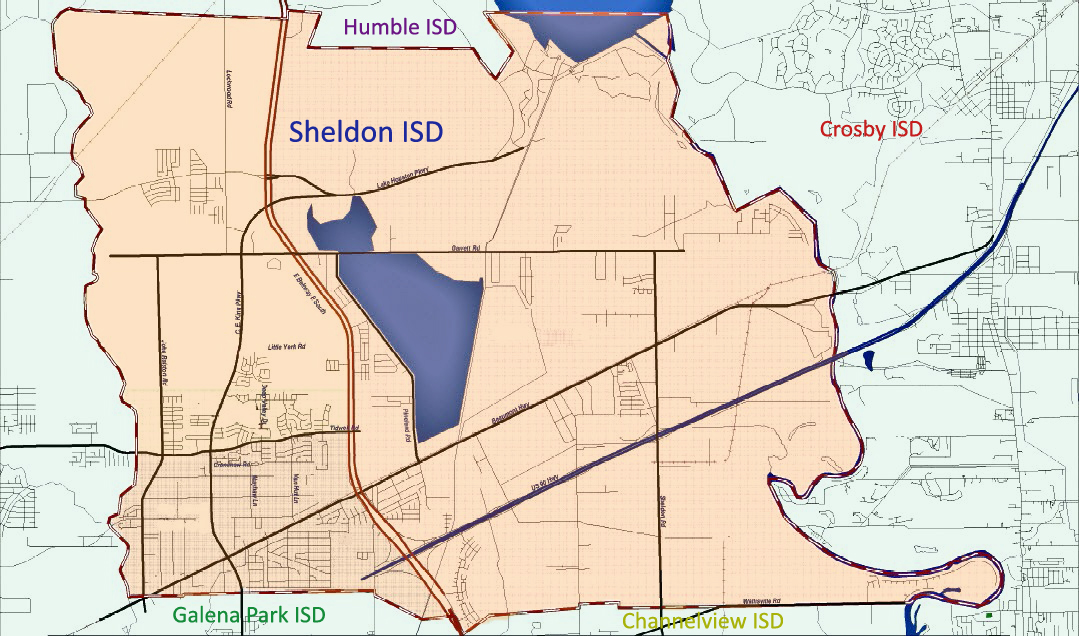
Sheldon ISD Boundaries

Sheldon ISD covers a large portion of northeast Harris county. From west to east, it is geographically bounded by Greens Bayou on the west, and by the San Jacinto River on the east. Its southern boundary runs along the Crosby Freeway until Beltway 8 and Carpenters Bayou where the boundary line drops south to include Liberty Lakes subdivision. Its northern boundary follows an arbitrary line that extends from Greens Bayou on the west, to south of Lake Houston.

=== Communities Served ===
Beaumont Place, Houmont Park, Magnolia Gardens, Sheldon

==== Subdivisions ====
Bavaria, Edgewood Village, Evergreen Villas, Greensbrook, Greenwoods, Hampton Oaks, Hidden Meadow, Houston Farms, Imperial Forest, Liberty Lakes, Meadow Lake, Parkway Forest, Ralston Acres, Reservoir Acres, Rio Villa, Royalwood, Sheldon Ridge, Sheldon Woods, Sierra Ranch, Stonefield Manor, Stonefield Terrace, Sunrise Pines, Tidwell Lakes, Village of Kings Lake.KINGLAKES KINGLAKE FOREST

== Schools ==
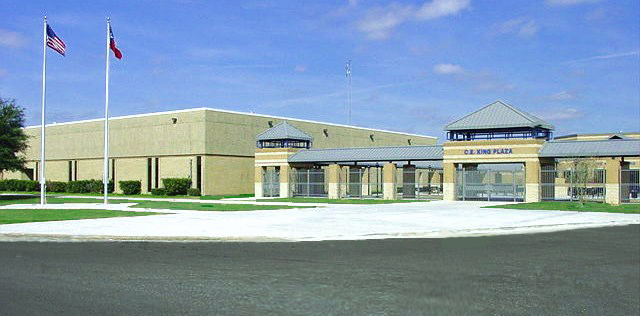
C. E. King High School

=== Secondary schools ===
==== High School (9-12) ====
School		Opened
C.E. King High School	Named after Cortes Ewing King, a Houston developer who donated land to the district	1954

===== Alternative school =====
- KASE Academy (10-12)

==== Middle Schools (6-8) ====
School		Opened
C.E. King Middle School	Named after Cortes Ewing King, a Houston developer who donated land to the district	1954
Michael R. Null Middle School	Named after Michael Null, a former administrator and Executive Director of Human Resources	2009

=== Primary schools ===
==== Elementary schools (1-5) ====
School		Opened
Royalwood Elementary School	Named after the subdivision it is in	1968
L.E. Monahan Elementary School	Named for a former administrator L.E. Monahan	1983
Sheldon Elementary School	Named after the School district	1957, rebuilt 2004
H.M. Carroll Elementary School	Named for late board member H.M. "Dickey" Carroll	2008
Garrett Elementary School	Named for the road on which it is located	2011
Sheldon Lake Elementary School		2019

==== Early Childhood Centers (PreK-K) ====
School		Opened
Sheldon Early Childhood Academy	In the former Sheldon 6th Grade Campus	2009
Stephanie Cravens Early Childhood Academy	Named for former superintendent Stephanie Cravens	2004

== Former schools ==
- Alamo School - The original school
- Parkway Elementary School - Opened in 1972 on a 10-acre (4.0 ha) tract donated by the Parkway subdivision to the Sheldon ISD administration. At a later point the elementary school closed, and C.E. King High School used the facility as an annex; it still does as of 2011.

== Transportation ==
The Sheldon ISD Transportation Department provides school bus transportation to students who live 2 mi (3.2 km) or more away from their campus.

The district provides an online tool that shows bus route information.

== Dress code ==
1. Students may not wear a military uniform to school unless it is in conjunction with a school-approved activity. 2. Students may not wear suggestive or inappropriately-located decorative patches, insignia, or clothing with improper advertising, pictures, slogans, or statements. 3. A flag is not to be worn as an article of clothing. 4. Hats or head coverings may not be worn in the school buildings. 5. Appropriate footwear is required. 6. Any garment or design of a garment which is too short or too revealing may not be worn to school. Appropriate undergarments must be worn. 7. Any attire that is distracting or disturbing will not be permitted on school property. 8. No underwear-styled garments will be worn as an outer garment. 9. Shorts/skirts/dresses are acceptable as long as they are fingertip length or longer when standing. Bike shorts of any style or length, worn either as an outer or visible under garment, are prohibited. 10. Pants that hang on the hipbone, result in a bare midriff, or are too revealing are not acceptable. The waistband or other material belonging to the undergarments must not be visible. No holes or tears above mid-thigh are acceptable unless worn over leggings or tights. 11. Any low-cut, see-through, or backless garment may not be worn to school. Straps on outer garments must be sufficiently wide to cover undergarments. 12. Hair must be clean, well groomed, and of a natural hair color (black, brown, brunette, blonde, natural red). Any hair style that is distracting or disturbing will not be permitted on school property. 13. [High School Only] Facial hair must be neatly groomed and styled in a way that is not distracting and may not reach a length greater than 1 inch. 14. No paraphernalia that indicates or promotes gang membership may be worn or displayed (this may include but is not limited to bandannas, chains, jewelry, hip cloths, baggy pants, t-shirts, gang writing, and color codes). 15. Piercings: • Earrings are allowed. • No other body piercings are allowed (i.e., eyebrow, nose, tongue rings, etc). 16. Tattoos, icons and any other markings on the body that cannot be removed shall be covered at all times in an unobtrusive manner that is not disruptive to the instructional process. A student who has such markings on his or her body and who wishes to participate in extracurricular activities shall ensure that the markings are covered by the standard uniform for the activity or in another appropriate manner. The principal, in cooperation with the sponsor, coach, or other person in charge of an extracurricular activity, shall regulate and enforce these guidelines. 17. Students may not wear orthodontic appliances (i.e., grills) unless prescribed by a medical doctor/dentist. 18. Backpacks must be clear or mesh unless it is in conjunction with a school-approved activity (i.e., cheerleading, Pantherettes, athletics). 19. Student IDs must be worn at all times.

== Athletic facilities ==
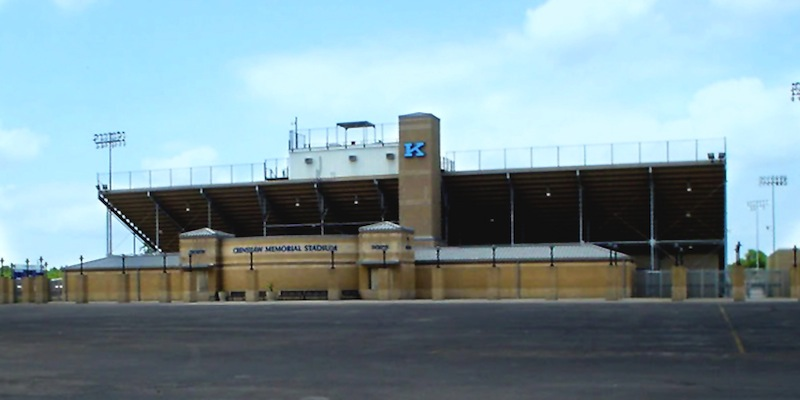
Crenshaw Memorial Stadium

Crenshaw Memorial Stadium
Sheldon ISD Panther Stadium
