= Eisenhower Park (disambiguation) =

Eisenhower Park is a park in East Meadow, New York.

Eisenhower Park or Dwight D. Eisenhower Park may also refer to:

- Eisenhower State Park (Kansas), in Osage County, Kansas
- Eisenhower State Park (Texas), near Denison, Texas
- Eisenhower National Historic Site, in Gettysburg, Pennsylvania
- Eisenhower Birthplace State Historic Site, in Denison, Texas
- Dwight D. Eisenhower Park (Houston), in Houston, Texas
- Dwight D. Eisenhower Park (San Antonio), a city park in San Antonio, Texas
- Eisenhower Park, a city park in Augusta, Georgia

== See also ==
- Eisenhower Parkway, Essex County, New Jersey
