= Houmont Park, Texas =

Unincorporated community in Harris County, Texas

Coordinates: 29°50′33″N 95°12′23″W

Houmont Park is an unincorporated area in east central Harris County, Texas, United States. It is located along Beaumont Highway (U.S. Highway 90) and the Southern Pacific Railroad, 2 miles (3.2 km) southwest of the Sheldon Reservoir.

The subdivision developed during the 1950s and the 1960s, as Greater Houston expanded in size.

== Education ==
Sheldon Independent School District operates schools serving the community.

An elementary school, C.E. King Middle School, C.E. King High School, and the district's Crenshaw Memorial Stadium are within 1 mile (1.6 km) of the Houmont Park townsite.

Residents are zoned to Cravens Early Childhood Academy, Royalwood Elementary School, King Middle School, and King High School.
