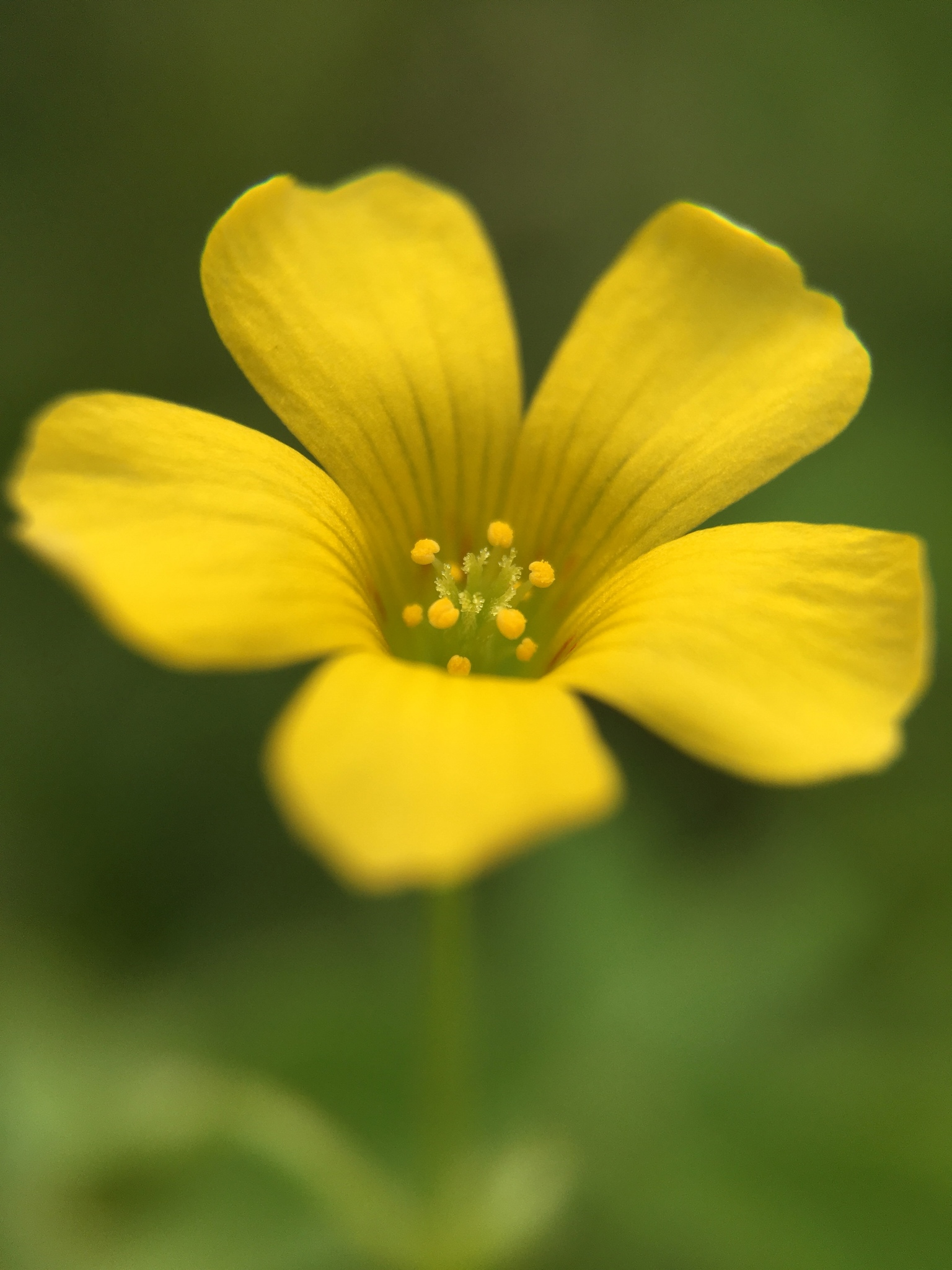

Scientific classification
- Kingdom: Plantae
- Clade: Embryophytes
- Clade: Tracheophytes
- Clade: Angiosperms
- Clade: Eudicots
- Clade: Rosids
- Order: Oxalidales
- Family: Oxalidaceae
- Genus: Oxalis
- Species: O. corniculata

Binomial name
- Oxalis corniculata L.

Synonyms
- Acetosella corniculata; Oxalis corniculata var. typica; Oxys corniculata; Xanthoxalis corniculata

= Oxalis corniculata =

Species of yellow wood sorrel

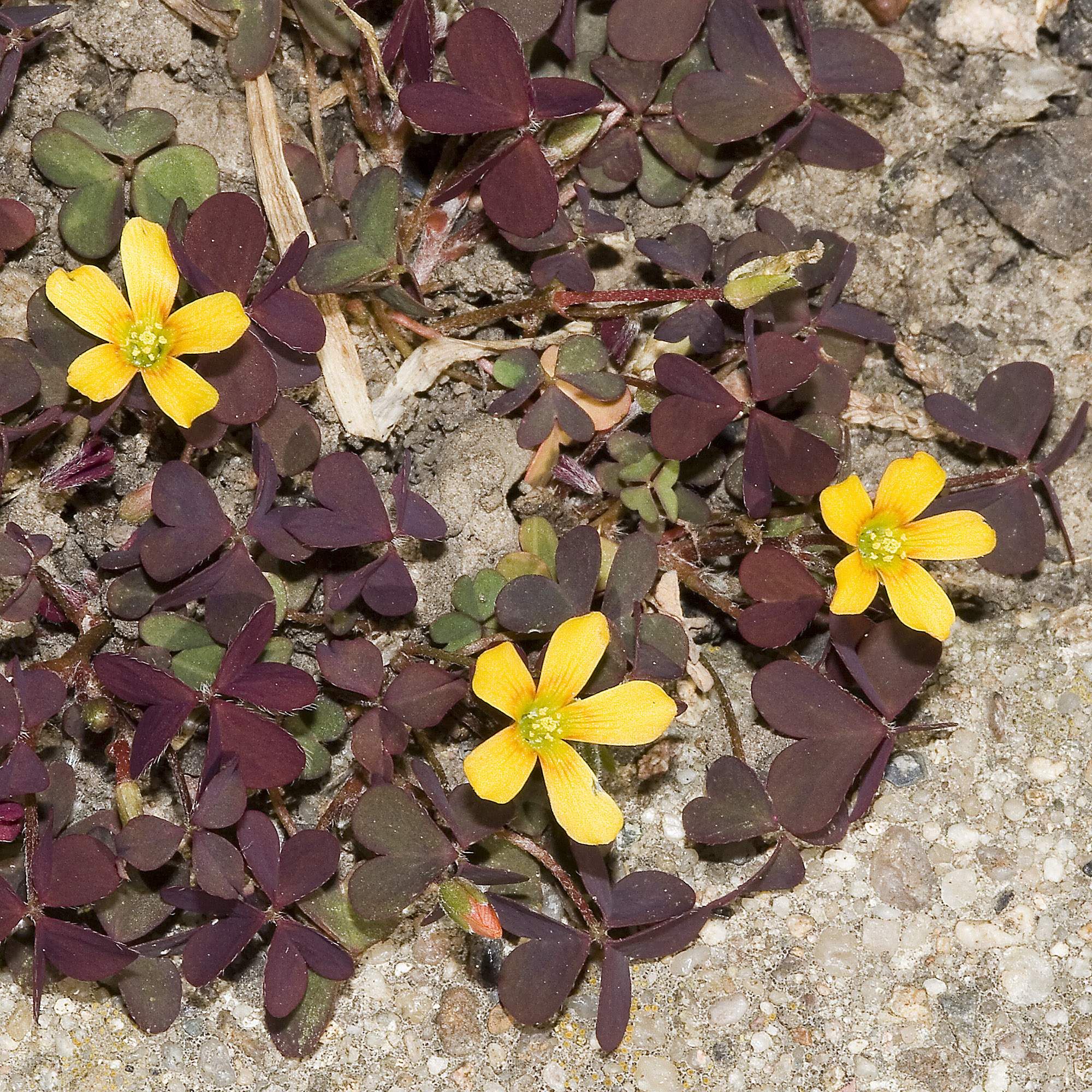
Purple leaved variety.

Oxalis corniculata, the creeping woodsorrel, procumbent yellow sorrel or sleeping beauty, is a somewhat delicate-appearing, low-growing herbaceous plant in the family Oxalidaceae.

Oxalis corniculata is a small creeping type of woodsorrel that tends to grow well in moist climates. It resembles the common yellow woodsorrel, Oxalis stricta.

== Description ==
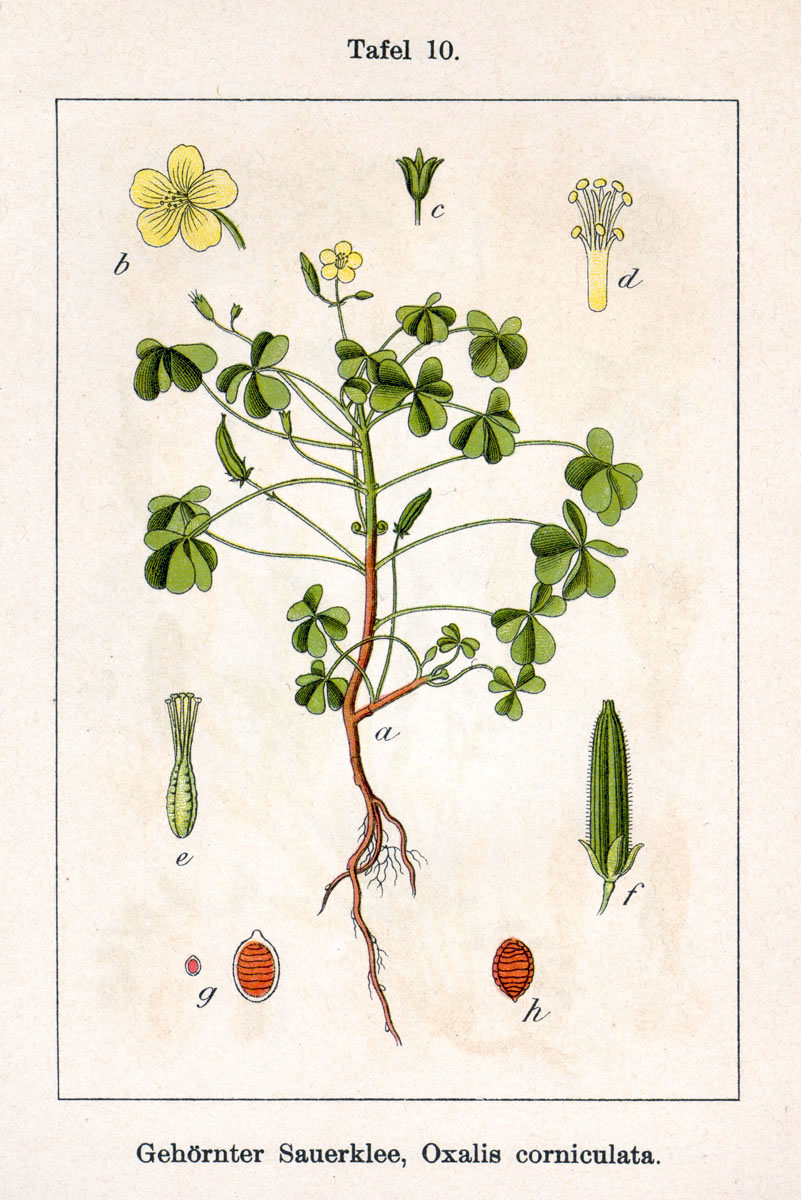

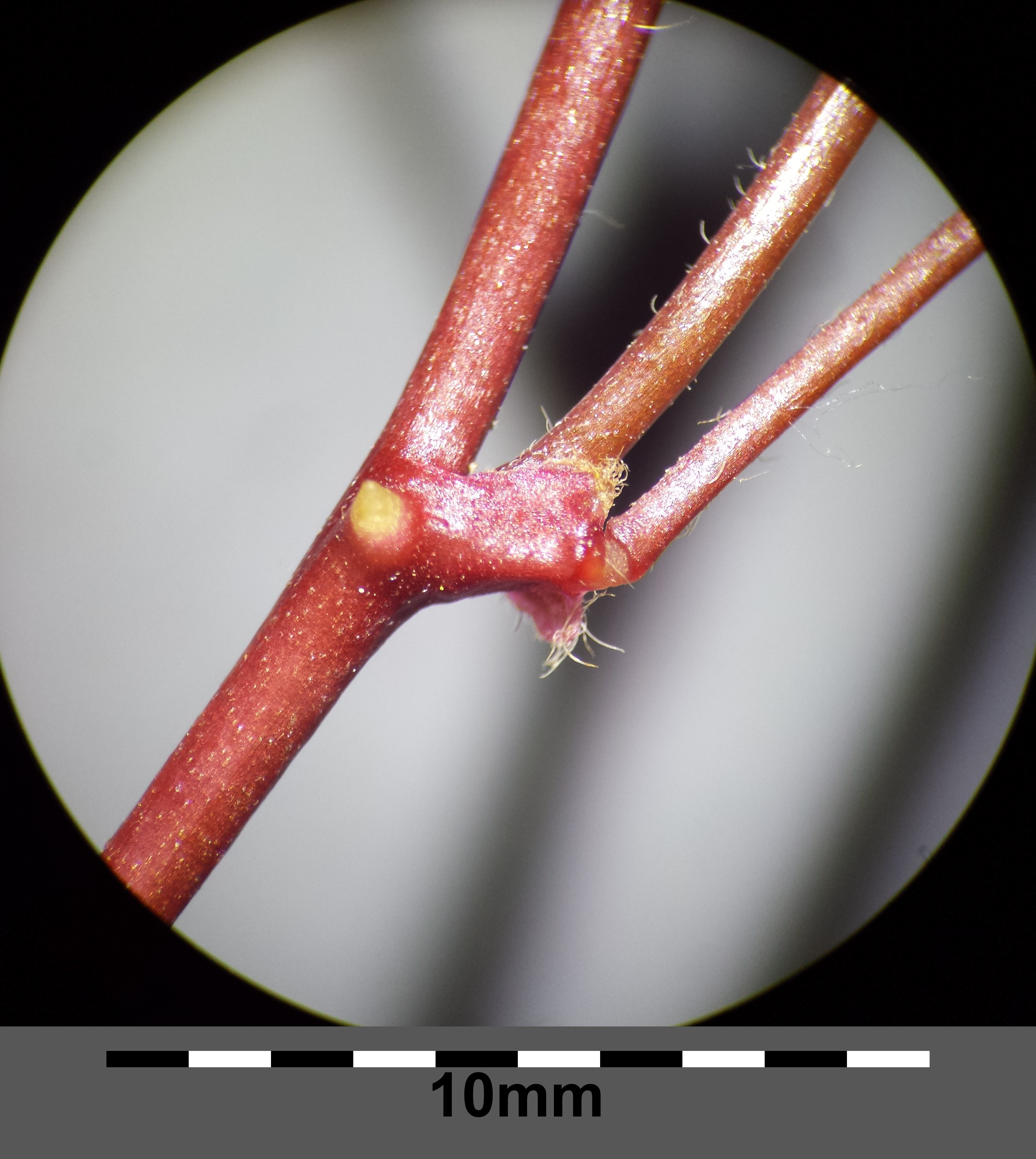
Stems with leaf stalk and side leaf (inconspicuous stipules at the base of each petiole are visible too)

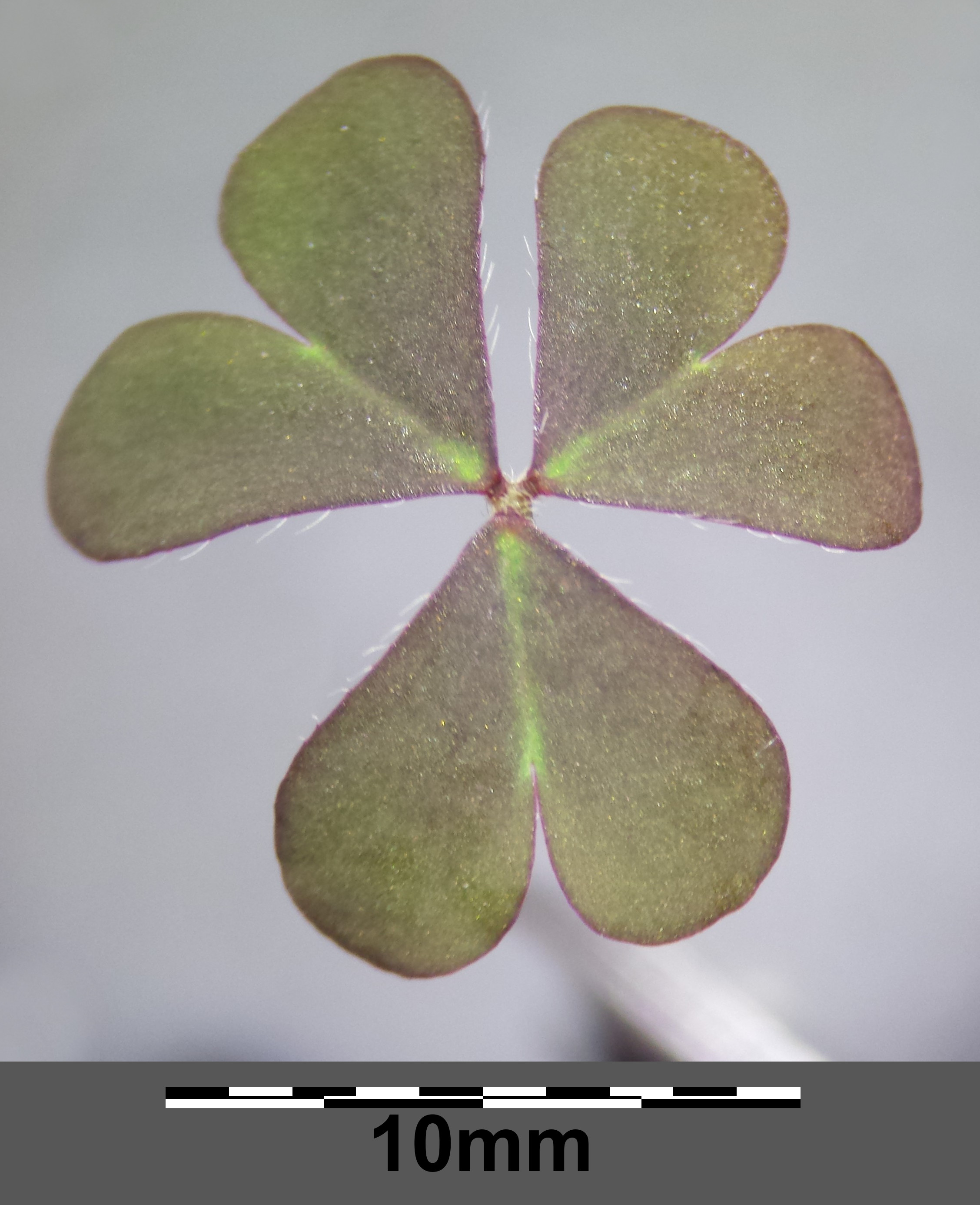
Trifoliate leaf of Oxalis corniculata

It has a narrow, creeping stem that easily takes root at the nodes. Its trifoliate leaves are subdivided into three rounded leaflets, resembling a clover. Some varieties have green leaves, while others, such as Oxalis corniculata var. atropurpurea, have purple leaves. There are inconspicuous stipules at the base of each petiole. The small, yellow flowers have either round-edged or sharp-ended petals. The flowers close when the plant is not within direct sunlight, hence the name "sleeping beauty". Some specimens can have a single flower while others can have over 20.

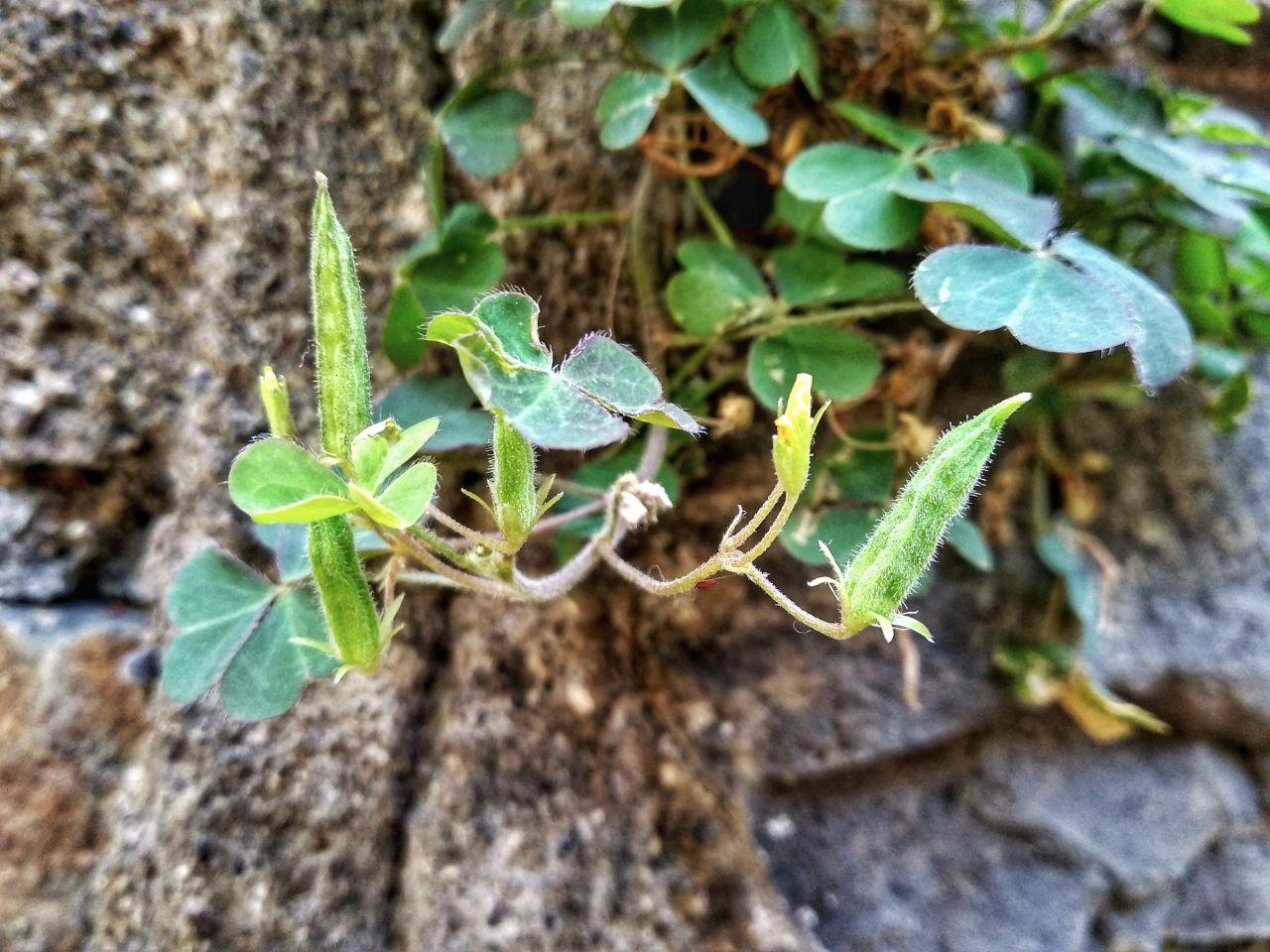
Fruits of Oxalis corniculata

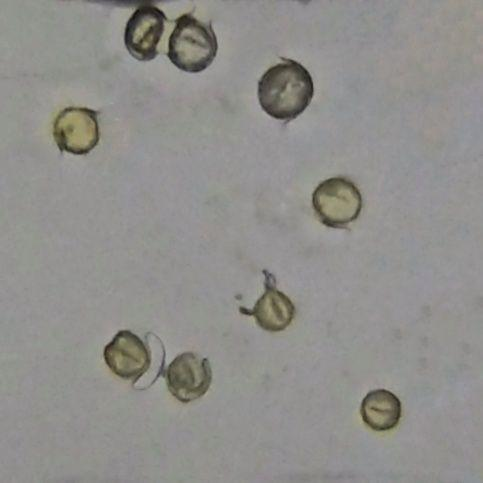
Pollen of Oxalis corniculata

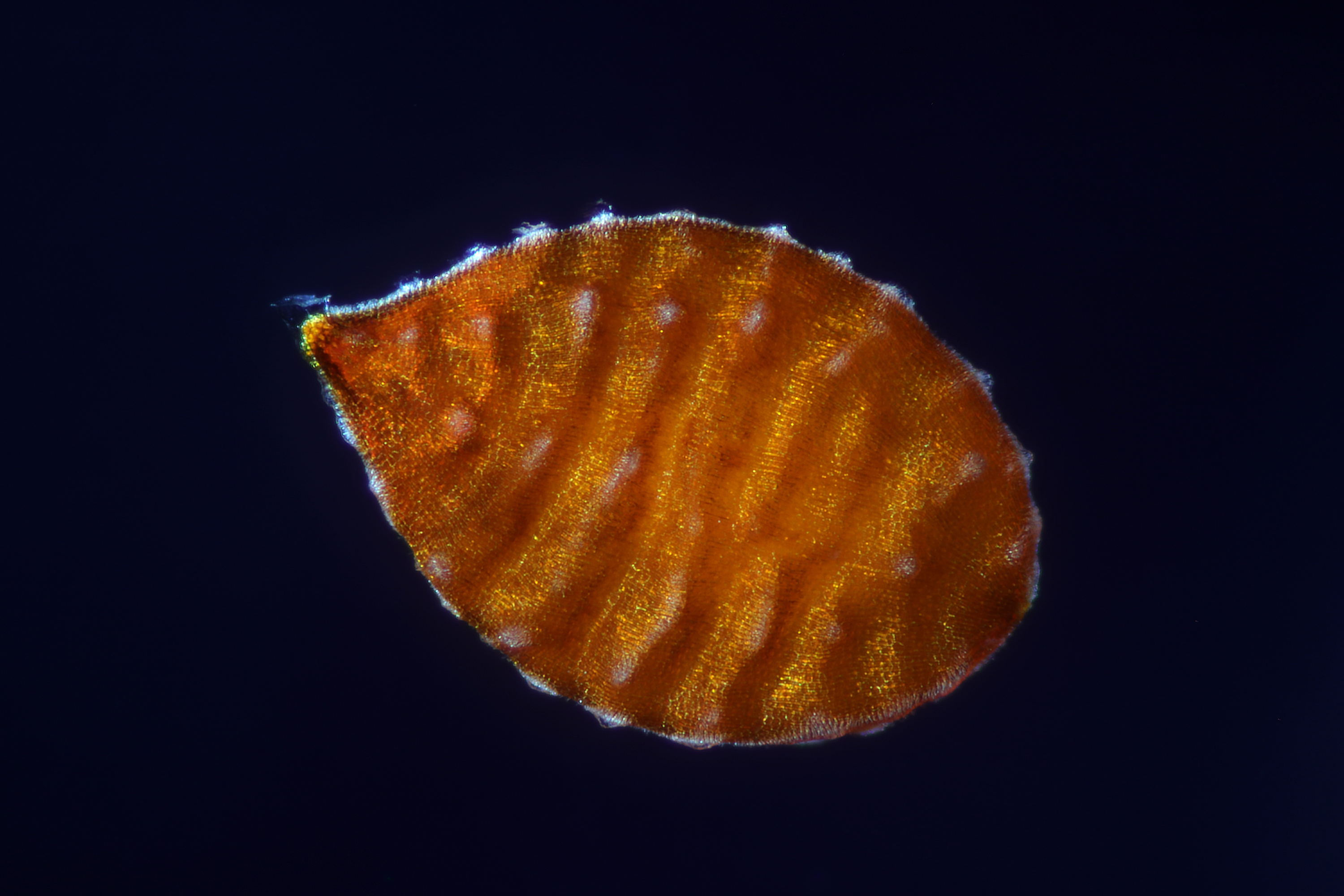
Matured seed of Oxalis corniculata

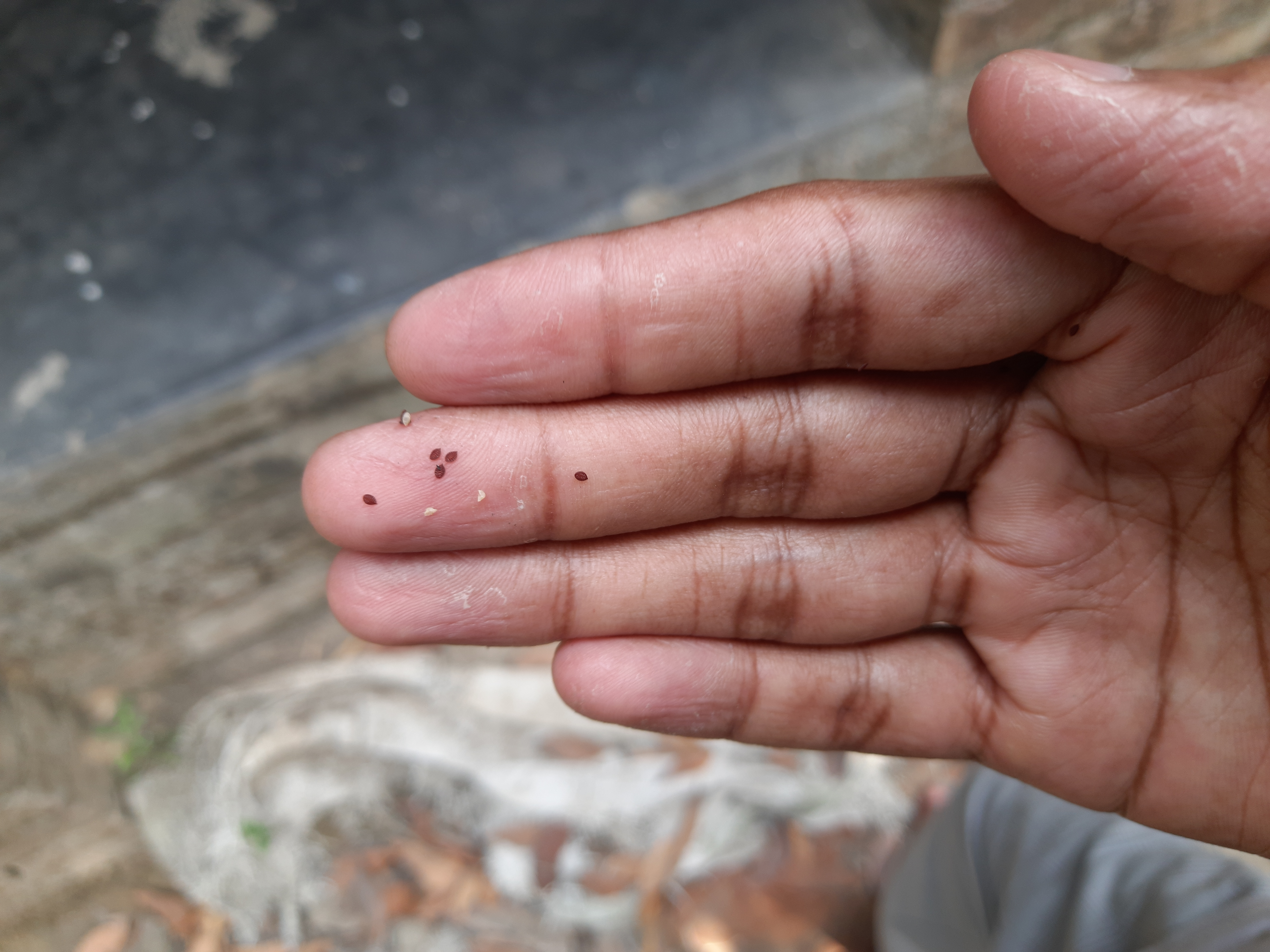
Mature (brown) and immature (white) seeds of Oxalis corniculata

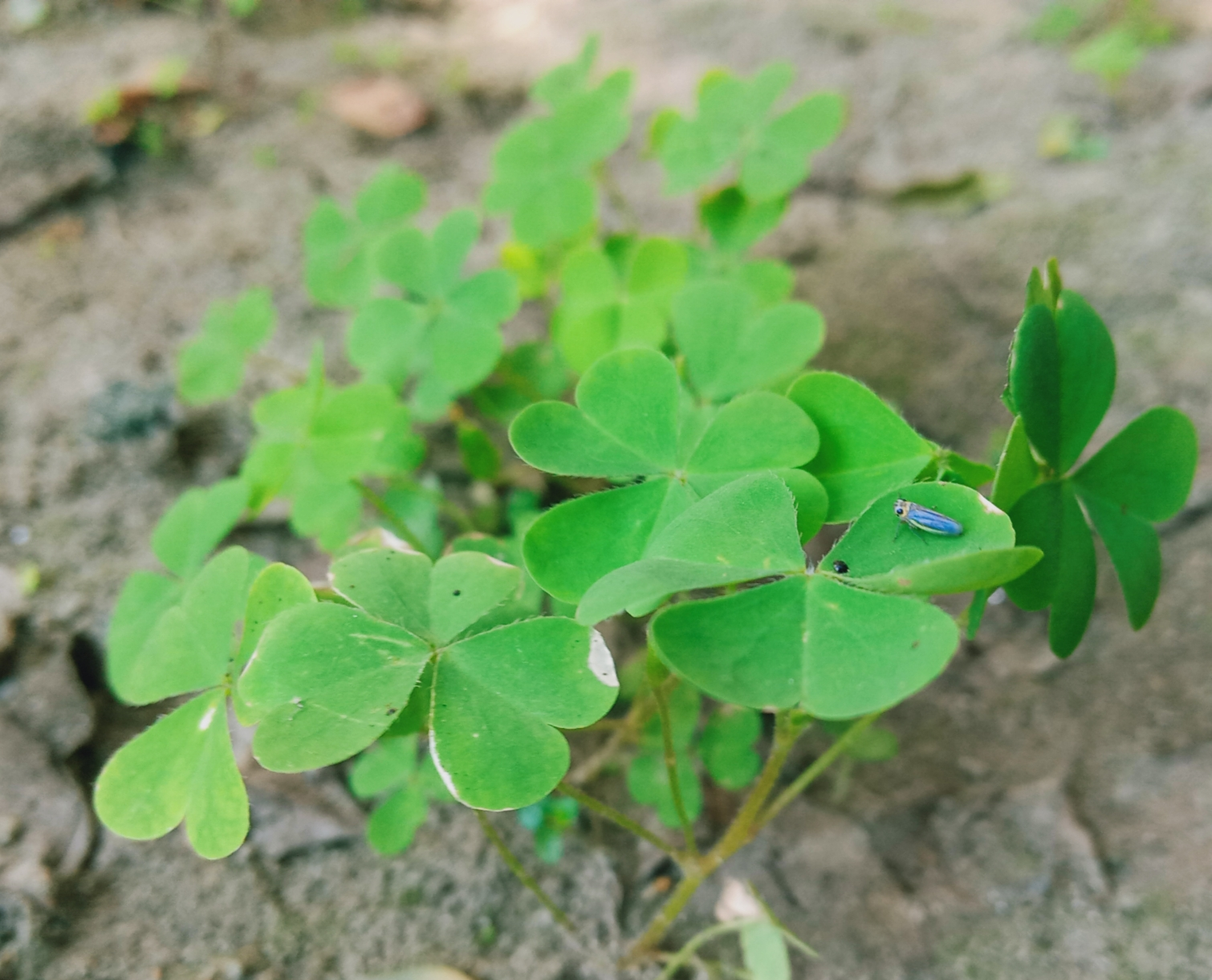
Oxalis corniculata plant on moist soil

The fruit is a narrow, cylindrical capsule, 1–2 cm (0.4–0.8 in) long, and noteworthy for its explosive discharge of the contained seeds, 1 mm (0.04 in) long. Pollen is about 34 microns in diameter.

== Taxonomy ==
Oxalis corniculata was given its scientific name by Carl Linnaeus in 1753. It is classified in the genus Oxalis and within the family Oxalidaceae. It has no accepted varieties, but has many among its 96 synonyms.

Table of Synonyms
| Name | Year | Rank | Notes |
|---|---|---|---|
| Acetosella corniculata (L.) Kuntze | 1891 | species | ≡ hom. |
| Acetosella corniculata var. subglabra Kuntze | 1891 | variety | = het. |
| Acetosella corniculata var. villosa (M.Bieb.) Kuntze | 1891 | variety | = het. |
| Acetosella herpestica (Schltdl.) Kuntze | 1891 | species | = het. |
| Acetosella simulans (Baker) Kuntze | 1891 | species | = het. |
| Oxalis albicans var. sericea DC. | 1824 | variety | ≡ hom. |
| Oxalis boridiensis R.Knuth | 1940 | species | = het. |
| Oxalis ceratilis E.Mey. | 1843 | species | = het., nom. nud. |
| Oxalis ciliifera A.Cunn. | 1839 | species | = het. |
| Oxalis corniculata var. atropurpurea Planch. | 1857 | variety | = het. |
| Oxalis corniculata var. ciliifera (A.Cunn.) Hook.f. | 1852 | variety | = het. |
| Oxalis corniculata var. corcovadensis R.Knuth | 1930 | variety | ≡ hom. |
| Oxalis corniculata f. erecta Makino | 1912 | form | = het. |
| Oxalis corniculata var. glabrocapsula Roti Mich. | 1978 | variety | = het. |
| Oxalis corniculata var. hispida Blatt. | 1931 | variety | ≡ hom. |
| Oxalis corniculata var. javanica (Blume) Backer | 1911 | variety | = het. |
| Oxalis corniculata var. langloisii (Small) Wiegand | 1925 | variety | = het. |
| Oxalis corniculata var. lupulina (Kunth) Zucc. | 1823 | variety | = het. |
| Oxalis corniculata var. macrophylla Arsène ex R.Knuth | 1919 | variety | = het. |
| Oxalis corniculata var. minima Poir. | 1816 | variety | = het. |
| Oxalis corniculata var. minor Lange | 1878 | variety | = het. |
| Oxalis corniculata f. minor Lange ex Fiori | 1907 | form | = het., nom. illeg. |
| Oxalis corniculata var. pilosiuscula (Kunth) Zucc. | 1823 | variety | = het. |
| Oxalis corniculata var. pubescens Griseb. | 1859 | variety | = het. |
| Oxalis corniculata f. pubescens Batt. | 1888 | form | = het., nom. illeg. |
| Oxalis corniculata subsp. purpurea (Parl.) Arcang. | 1882 | subspecies | = het. |
| Oxalis corniculata var. purpurea Parl. | 1873 | variety | = het. |
| Oxalis corniculata f. purpurea (Parl.) Fiori | 1901 | form | = het. |
| Oxalis corniculata var. radicosa (A.Rich.) Roti Mich. | 1978 | variety | = het. |
| Oxalis corniculata subsp. repens (Thunb.) Masam. | 1934 | subspecies | = het. |
| Oxalis corniculata var. repens (Thunb.) Zucc. | 1831 | variety | = het. |
| Oxalis corniculata var. reptans Laing | 1914 | variety | = het. |
| Oxalis corniculata var. rubra Makino | 1910 | variety | = het., nom. illeg. |
| Oxalis corniculata rubra G.Nicholson | 1886 | | = het. |
| Oxalis corniculata var. rubrifolia Makino | 1926 | variety | = het. |
| Oxalis corniculata f. rubrifolia (Makino) H.Hara | 1954 | form | = het. |
| Oxalis corniculata f. speciosa (Masam.) Masam. | 1938 | form | = het. |
| Oxalis corniculata var. taiwanensis Masam. | 1938 | variety | = het. |
| Oxalis corniculata var. trichocaulon H.Lév. | 1910 | variety | = het. |
| Oxalis corniculata var. tropaeoloides (E.Fürst) H.Hirzel | 1861 | variety | = het. |
| Oxalis corniculata f. tropaeoloides (E.Fürst) R.Knuth | 1930 | form | = het. |
| Oxalis corniculata var. typica R.Knuth | 1919 | variety | ≡ hom., not validly publ. |
| Oxalis corniculata var. villosa (M.Bieb.) Hohen. | 1837 | variety | = het. |
| Oxalis corniculata var. villosa P.Fourn. | 1937 | variety | = het., nom. illeg. |
| Oxalis corniculata f. villosa (M.Bieb.) Fiori | 1907 | form | = het. |
| Oxalis corniculata var. viscidula Wiegand | 1925 | variety | = het. |
| Oxalis foliosa Blatt. | 1930 | species | = het. |
| Oxalis furcata Elliott | 1821 | species | = het. |
| Oxalis glauca Raf. ex DC. | 1824 | species | = het., not validly publ. |
| Oxalis grenadensis Urb. | 1912 | species | = het. |
| Oxalis herpestica Schltdl. | 1856 | species | = het. |
| Oxalis humistrata Willd. ex Steud. | 1841 | species | = het., not validly publ. |
| Oxalis jamaicensis Macfad. | 1837 | species | = het. |
| Oxalis javanica Blume | 1825 | species | = het. |
| Oxalis langloisii (Small) Fedde | 1905 | species | = het. |
| Oxalis lujula Noronha | 1790 | species | = het., nom. nud. |
| Oxalis lupulina Kunth | 1822 | species | = het. |
| Oxalis lutea Steud. | 1821 | species | = het., not validly publ. |
| Oxalis meridensis Pittier | 1930 | species | = het. |
| Oxalis micrantha Bojer ex Progel | 1877 | species | = het., not validly publ. |
| Oxalis minima Steud. | 1821 | species | = het., not validly publ. |
| Oxalis monadelpha Roxb. ex Wight & Arn. | 1834 | species | = het. |
| Oxalis norlindiana R.Knuth | 1927 | species | = het. |
| Oxalis pilosiuscula Kunth | 1822 | species | = het. |
| Oxalis pubescens Stokes | 1812 | species | = het. |
| Oxalis pusilla Salisb. | 1794 | species | = het., nom. illeg. |
| Oxalis radicosa A.Rich. | 1848 | species | ≡ hom. |
| Oxalis recisa Noronha | 1790 | species | = het., nom. nud. |
| Oxalis repens Thunb. | 1781 | species | = het. |
| Oxalis repens var. erecta (Makino) Masam. | 1930 | variety | = het. |
| Oxalis repens f. speciosa Masam. | 1930 | form | = het. |
| Oxalis reptans Sol. ex G.Forst. | 1786 | species | = het., nom. nud. |
| Oxalis simulans Baker | 1883 | species | = het. |
| Oxalis steudeliana R.Knuth | 1927 | species | = het. |
| Oxalis taiwanensis (Masam.) Masam. | 1940 | species | = het. |
| Oxalis tenuicaulis A.Cunn. | 1839 | species | = het. |
| Oxalis thunbergiana Montrouz. | 1860 | species | = het., nom. illeg. |
| Oxalis trinidadensis R.Knuth | 1927 | species | = het. |
| Oxalis tropaeoloides E.Fürst | 1858 | species | = het. |
| Oxalis uittienii J.T.Jansen | 1947 | species | = het. |
| Oxalis urvillei A.Cunn. | 1839 | species | = het. |
| Oxalis villosa M.Bieb. | 1808 | species | = het. |
| Oxys corniculata (L.) Scop. | 1771 | species | ≡ hom. |
| Oxys lutea Lam. | 1779 | species | = het. |
| Xanthoxalis corniculata (L.) Small | 1903 | species | ≡ hom. |
| Xanthoxalis corniculata var. atropurpurea (Planch.) Moldenke | 1947 | variety | = het. |
| Xanthoxalis corniculata f. atropurpurea (Planch.) Nakai | 1952 | form | = het. |
| Xanthoxalis corniculata f. erecta (Makino) Nakai | 1952 | form | = het. |
| Xanthoxalis corniculata subsp. purpurea (Parl.) Nakai | 1952 | subspecies | = het. |
| Xanthoxalis corniculata f. purpurea (Parl.) Nakai | 1952 | form | = het. |
| Xanthoxalis corniculata subsp. repens (Thunb.) Tzvelev | 1996 | subspecies | = het. |
| Xanthoxalis corniculata var. repens (Thunb.) Nakai | 1952 | variety | = het. |
| Xanthoxalis grenadensis (Urb.) Tzvelev ex Prob. & Sokolovsk. | 1988 | species | = het. |
| Xanthoxalis langloisii Small | 1903 | species | = het. |
| Xanthoxalis repens (Thunb.) Moldenke | 1944 | species | = het. |
| Xanthoxalis trinidadensis (R.Knuth) Holub | 1973 | species | = het. |
Notes: ≡ homotypic synonym ; = heterotypic synonym

== Distribution ==
This species probably comes from southeastern Asia. It was first described by Linnaeus in 1753 using specimens from Italy, and it seems to have been introduced to Italy from the east before 1500. It is now cosmopolitan in its distribution and is often regarded as a weed in gardens, agricultural fields, and lawns.

== Chloroplast genome ==
The chloroplast genome sequence is 152,189 bp in size, and contains 131 genes. It includes a pair of 25,387 bp inverted repeats that separate a large 83,427 bp single copy region. The genome suggests that this plant is closely related to O. drummondii.

== Uses ==
The leaves of this species are edible, and have a tangy taste like lemons. A drink can be made by infusing the leaves in hot water for about 10 minutes, sweetening, and then chilling. The entire plant is rich in vitamin C. Any woodsorrel is safe in low dosages, but if eaten in large quantities over a length of time can inhibit calcium absorption by the body.

Indigenous peoples of Taiwan frequently grow this plant (known roughly as p-r-səʔ) as a cure for snakebites and scabies.
