= Sheldon, Texas =

- Unincorporated Community and Census-designated place
- Location in Harris County and the state of Texas
- Coordinates: 29°51′38″N 95°8′2″W
- Country: United States
- State: Texas
- County: Harris

Area
  - Total: 2.6 sq mi (6.7 km^{2})
  - Land: 2.6 sq mi (6.7 km^{2})
  - Water: 0 sq mi (0.0 km^{2})
- Elevation: 46 ft (14 m)

Population (2020)
  - Total: 2,361
  - Density: 910/sq mi (350/km^{2})
- Time zone: UTC-6 (Central (CST))
  - Summer (DST): UTC-5 (CDT)
- ZIP codes: 77044 & 77049
- Area codes: 281, 713, 832, 346
- FIPS code: 48-67376
- GNIS feature ID: 1380920

Sheldon is an unincorporated community and a census-designated place (CDP) in northeastern Harris County, Texas, United States, located completely inside the extraterritorial jurisdiction of the City of Houston. The Sheldon area is located along Beltway 8 and US Highway 90, approximately twelve miles (19 km) northeast of Downtown Houston.

Since the 1950s, the population growth of Sheldon has grown to extend past the statistical census-designated place (CDP) boundary originally delineated by the United States Census Bureau. The local understanding of the area is that it corresponds to that of boundary of the Sheldon Independent School District.

Residential and commercial development in Sheldon has increased since the 2000s, gradually transforming the once rural area into one of the Houston area's fast growing suburban communities by percentage.

The population for the area within the CDP was 2,361 at the 2020 census. Zip codes that correspond to the Sheldon area include 77049 and 77044.

== History ==
Sheldon opened in the 1860s and served as a retail marketing point for agricultural goods and lumber from an area on the San Jacinto River. Its name originated from Henry K. Sheldon, who was a stockholder in a railroad company. In 1887 a post office opened. In 1896 Sheldon had 50 residents and a general store and a grocer. In 1905 it had a school. In the 1940s it had 150 residents and ten businesses. In the 1950s Sheldon had 200 residents. In 1955 the post office closed. In 1980 Sheldon had 1,665 residents. In 1990 it had 1,653 residents. In 2000 it had 1,831 residents.

In a 10-year period before 2011, the population increased by 46%.

== Geography ==
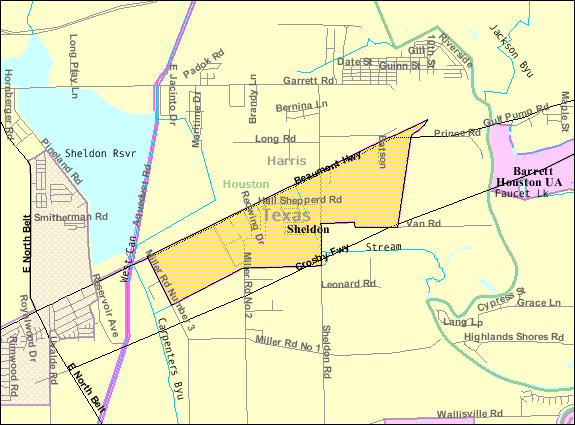
Map of Sheldon CDP

Sheldon is located at 29°51′38″N 95°8′2″W (29.860569, -95.133801) in northeastern Harris County.

The area is within the watersheds of Greens Bayou, Carpenters Bayou, and San Jacinto River. The boundary is unofficially known as corresponding to that of Sheldon Independent School District, which is geographically bound by Greens Bayou on the west and the San Jacinto River on the east. The northern border is the southern shore of Lake Houston and the southern boundary runs approximately one mile south of the Crosby Freeway (US Hwy 90).

Sheldon has a mostly wooded geographic profile, with some grassy prairies. The area is also home to Sheldon Lake State Park and Environmental Learning Center, which has a variety of land and water fauna.

The majority of Sheldon falls under the jurisdiction of Harris County Commissioner Precinct 1, with a small portion in Precinct 2.

Major arteries in the area include Beltway 8 and US Highway 90.

== Demographics ==
Historical population
Census	Pop.	Note	%±
1970	1,665		—
1980	2,031		22.0%
1990	1,653		−18.6%
2000	1,831		10.8%
2010	1,990		8.7%
2020	2,361		18.6%
U.S. Decennial Census; 1850–1900 1910; 1920 1930 1940; 1950 1960 1970; 1980 1990 2000; 2010 2020

Sheldon first appeared as an unincorporated place in the 1970 U.S. census; and was designated a census designated place in the 1980 United States census.

=== 2020 census ===
Sheldon CDP, Texas – Racial and ethnic composition Note: the US Census treats Hispanic/Latino as an ethnic category. This table excludes Latinos from the racial categories and assigns them to a separate category. Hispanics/Latinos may be of any race.
Race / Ethnicity (NH = Non-Hispanic)	Pop 2000	Pop 2010	Pop 2020	% 2000	% 2010	% 2020
White alone (NH)	1,114	557	366	60.84%	27.99%	15.50%
Black or African American alone (NH)	48	55	206	2.62%	2.76%	8.73%
Native American or Alaska Native alone (NH)	9	11	2	0.49%	0.55%	0.08%
Asian alone (NH)	1	21	18	0.05%	1.06%	0.76%
Native Hawaiian or Pacific Islander alone (NH)	0	0	0	0.00%	0.05%	0.00%
Other Race alone (NH)	2	3	1	0.11%	0.15%	0.04%
Mixed race or Multiracial (NH)	22	17	45	1.20%	0.85%	1.91%
Hispanic or Latino (any race)	635	1,325	1,723	34.68%	66.58%	72.98%
Total	1,831	1,990	2,361	100.00%	100.00%	100.00%

As of the 2020 United States census, there were 2,361 people, 521 households, and 458 families residing in the CDP.

As of the census of 2000, there were 1,831 people, 546 households, and 447 families residing in the CDP. The population density was 709.0 inhabitants per square mile (273.7/km^{2}). There were 600 housing units at an average density of 232.3 per square mile (89.7/km^{2}). The racial makeup of the CDP was 78.92% White, 2.73% African American, 0.76% Native American, 0.05% Asian, 14.64% from other races, and 2.89% from two or more races. Hispanic or Latino of any race were 34.68% of the population.

There were 546 households, out of which 46.5% had children under the age of 18 living with them, 60.1% were married couples living together, 14.8% had a female householder with no husband present, and 18.1% were non-families. 13.7% of all households were made up of individuals, and 3.3% had someone living alone who was 65 years of age or older. The average household size was 3.35 and the average family size was 3.61.

In the CDP, the population was spread out, with 34.6% under the age of 18, 9.4% from 18 to 24, 31.9% from 25 to 44, 18.2% from 45 to 64, and 5.8% who were 65 years of age or older. The median age was 28 years. For every 100 females, there were 103.7 males. For every 100 females age 18 and over, there were 100.8 males.

The median income for a household in the CDP was $42,981, and the median income for a family was $45,219. Males had a median income of $31,071 versus $26,599 for females. The per capita income for the CDP was $15,309. About 9.0% of families and 11.7% of the population were below the poverty line, including 15.3% of those under age 18 and 4.2% of those age 65 or over.

== Government and infrastructure ==
The area of Sheldon was served by two volunteer fire departments before merging into one in 1996, the Sheldon Community Fire and Rescue. There are currently four stations with a fifth station planned in Generation Park on West Lake Houston Parkway & Lockwood Dr.

The United States Postal Service built a post office in Sheldon in 1890 and it operated until its closure in 1953. Sheldon is currently serviced by neighboring post offices.

Harris Health System (formerly Harris County Hospital District) operates the Settegast Health Center in northeast Houston. The designated public hospital is Lyndon B. Johnson Hospital in Northeast Houston.

== Economy ==
Several large companies are located in Sheldon including LyondellBasell, Apache Industrial Services, National Oilwell Varco, Genan, and Koch. Sheldon is also home to the master planned enterprise park Generation Park which houses the headquarters of Fortune 500 FMC technologies which opened February 2016. Redemption Square in Generation Park is currently under construction with office buildings, restaurants, and hotels set to open in 2017.

Other companies that are currently relocating their offices to Sheldon include Stolt-Nielsen, McCord Development, and Patterson UTI which is building is corporate campus on 365 acres.

== Education ==
=== Primary and secondary schools ===
==== Public schools ====
Sheldon residents are zoned to Sheldon Independent School District. The CDP itself is zoned to: Sheldon Early Childhood Academy, Sheldon Elementary School, Michael R. Null Middle School, and C.E. King High School. C.E. King stands for Cortes Ewing King, who donated the land where the middle school and old high school are built.

The area middle school was C.E. King Middle School until Null Middle opened in 2009.

In 1905, one school in Sheldon had 39 African American students with a single teacher, while another had 15 White students and a teacher as well.

==== Private and Charter schools ====
Holy Trinity Episcopal School, a Pre-K3 - 12 Episcopal private school.

The Rhodes School, a magnet charter school.

=== Colleges and universities ===
San Jacinto College District serves Sheldon ISD (including Sheldon). There is an extension center of San Jacinto College in Sheldon Early College High School with the nearest location being the North campus just south of Sheldon.

In 2015 San Jacinto College announced it purchased 57 acres in Generation Park to build the Sheldon Campus.
