= Harmaston, Texas =

Unincorporated community in Texas, US

Coordinates: 29°58′40″N 95°09′33″W

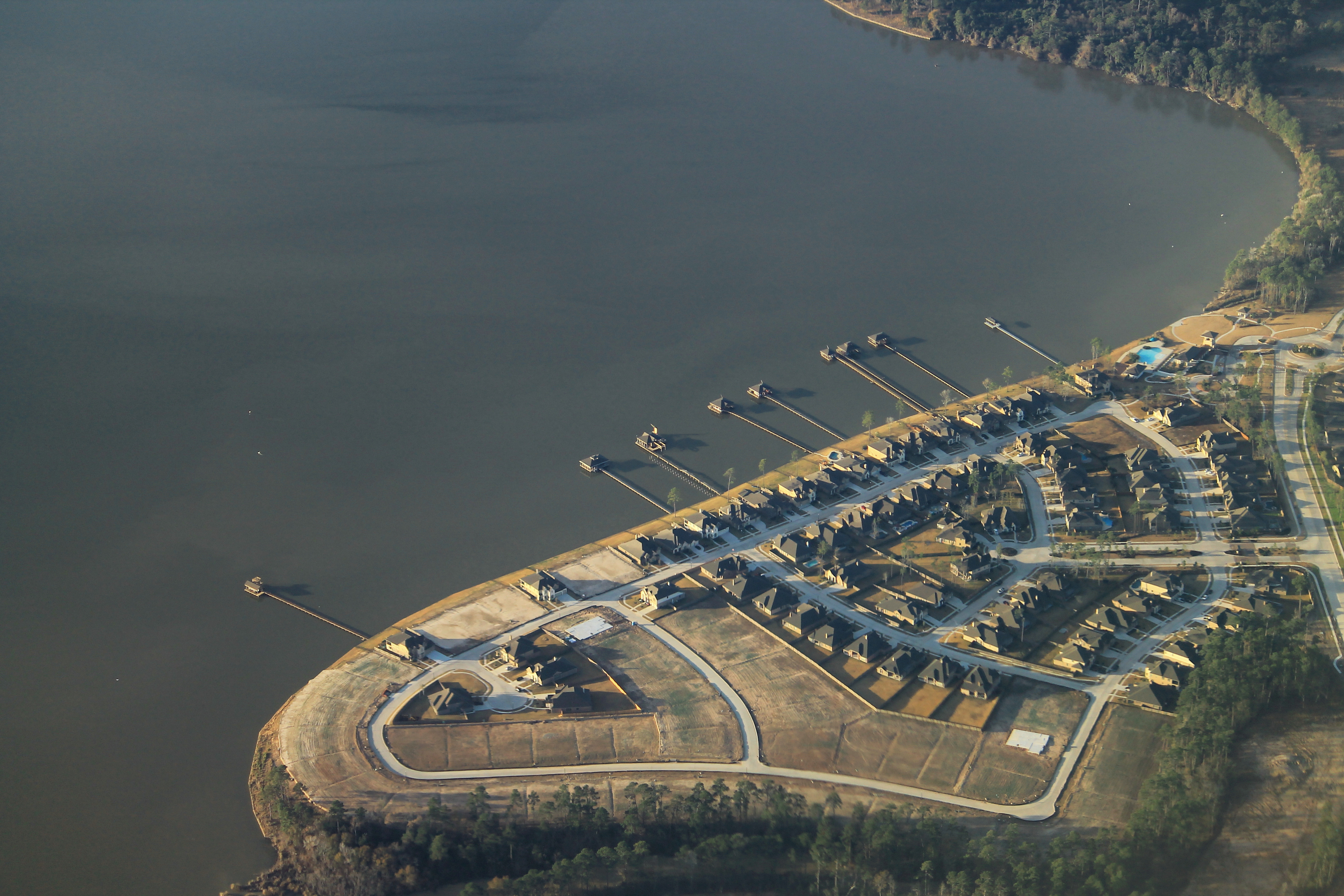
Newly developed homes in Harmaston at the shore of Lake Houston

Harmaston is a place in unincorporated northeastern Harris County, Texas, United States, that was formerly a distinct community.

Harmaston, located at the southwestern corner of Lake Houston, was developed along the timber shipping railroad line Beaumont, Sour Lake and Western Railway. Lumbermen from several companies, such as the Texas Longleaf Company, lived in a boarding house in Harmaston. By the 1980s, the remaining component of the community was an abandoned railway station.

== Education ==
Children attended school in the City of Humble.
