= Beaumont Place, Texas =

Unincorporated community in Texas, US

Coordinates: 29°50′14″N 95°11′59″W

Beaumont Place is an unincorporated community in east central Harris County, Texas, United States. It is located along Beaumont Highway (U.S. Highway 90) and the Southern Pacific Railroad. It is 2 miles (3.2 km) southwest of the Sheldon Reservoir.

As of 2004, several houses in Beaumont Place discharged wastewater into ditches and shallow trenches. For this reason the Texas Safe and Affordable Water and Wastewater Services (TSAWW) began to target Beaumont Place for improvements.

== Education ==
Sheldon Independent School District operates schools serving the community.

Residents are zoned to Cravens Early Childhood Academy, Royalwood Elementary School, C. E. King Middle School, and C. E. King High School.
