= George Wright (American football) =

American football player (born 1947)

No. 60, 74, 79
- Position: Defensive tackle

Personal information
- Born: March 3, 1947 (age 79); Houston, Texas, U.S.
- Listed height: 6 ft 3 in (1.91 m)
- Listed weight: 265 lb (120 kg)

Career information
- High school: C.E. King (Houston)
- College: Sam Houston State (1965–1968)
- NFL draft: 1969: 9th round, 210th overall pick

Career history
- Baltimore Colts (1970–1971); San Diego Chargers (1972)*; Cleveland Browns (1972)
- * Offseason or practice squad member only

Awards and highlights
- Super Bowl champion (V)

Career NFL statistics
- Games played: 16
- Games started: 0
- Stats at Pro Football Reference

George Wayne Wright (born March 3, 1947) is an American former professional football player who was a defensive tackle for three seasons in the National Football League (NFL) with the Baltimore Colts and Cleveland Browns. He was selected by the Colts in the ninth round of the 1969 NFL/AFL draft after playing college football for the Sam Houston State Bearkats. He was a member of the Colts team that won Super Bowl V.

== Early life and college ==
George Wayne Wright was born on March 3, 1947, in Houston, Texas. He attended C.E. King High School in Houston.

Wright lettered for the Sam Houston State Bearkats from 1965 to 1968. He earned All-Southland Conference honors in 1967 and 1968, and NAIA All-America honors in 1968. He was inducted into Sam Houston State's athletic Hall of Honor in 1994.

== Professional career ==
Wright was selected by the Baltimore Colts in the ninth round, with the 210th overall pick, of the 1969 NFL/AFL draft. He officially signed with the team on June 3. He was later released and spent time on the taxi squad in 1969. He became a free agent after the 1969 season and re-signed with the Colts. Wright was released on September 2, 1970, but re-signed. He played in two games for the Colts during the 1970 season. He also appeared in two playoff games that year. On January 17, 1971, the Colts won Super Bowl V against the Dallas Cowboys. Wright appeared in ten regular season games and one playoff game during the 1971 season.

On January 31, 1972, Wright was traded to the San Diego Chargers for several draft picks. On September 5, 1972, he was traded again, this time to the Cleveland Browns in exchange for a 1973 fifth round draft pick. Wright played in four games for the Browns in 1972. He was released the next year on August 10, 1973.
