= Crenshaw Memorial Stadium =

Stadium in Houston, Texas

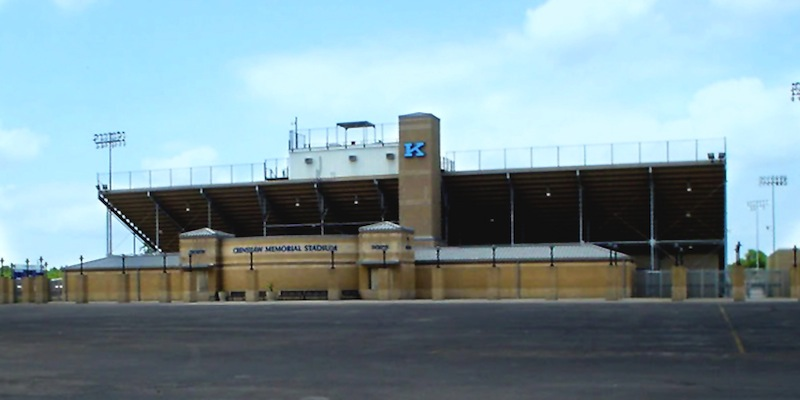
- Interactive map of Crenshaw Memorial Stadium
- Full name: J.H. Crenshaw Memorial Stadium
- Location: 8540 C.E. King Parkway; Houston, TX 77044
- Coordinates: 29.849238°N 95.209529°W
- Owner: Sheldon Independent School District
- Operator: Sheldon Independent School District
- Capacity: 6,000
- Surface: Artificial turf
- Scoreboard: Video board

Construction
- Renovated: 2004, 2010

Tenants
- C.E. King High School (1971 - 2019); C.E. King Middle School (1971 - present); Michael R. Null Middle School (2009 - present)

J.H. Crenshaw Memorial Stadium is a multi-purpose stadium in unincorporated Harris County located northeast of Houston, Texas. The stadium is owned and operated by Sheldon Independent School District and is composed of a track and field which are used for various sports. The stadium is situated in the space between C.E. King Middle School and C.E. King High School and is shared by C.E. King Middle school and Michael R. Null Middle School. Until 2019 when Sheldon ISD Panther Stadium was opened, it was used by C.E. King High School
The field is used for football during the first semester of the school year, and for soccer during the second half. Track and field athletics also use the stadium for competitive running, jumping, and throwing. It is mainly used for hosting University Interscholastic League athletic competitions against rival school districts in the region.

== History ==
The stadium was built in 1971 between C.E. King Middle school and C.E. King high school. In 1999, voters in Sheldon ISD passed a $97 million bond which included plans for new restrooms, ticket booths, and concession stands. In 2004 the stadium renovations were completed, resulting in improved access for handicapped persons. The bleachers kept the original Ɪ-beam design, but the metallic stands were replaced with concrete ones which allowed for less restrictive seating space.
In 2010, the stadium was once again updated to include professional grade track and field materials. The track was widened to 8 tracks and the surface was replaced with a 13mm thick synthetic surface composed of the Conipur SW system from BASF. In addition, the field grass was replaced with Desso D-Vision artificial turf. The home side bleachers also upgraded to include 22 inch wide theatre seats. The theatre seats are reserved for football season ticket buyers, those who make a one-time lifetime payment, and those who pay an extra fee at admission. The scoreboard was also upgraded to include a video board with action replay ability.

As part of the 2016 Bond, Sheldon ISD Panther Stadium was built in 2019, therefore becoming the new home stadium for C.E. King High's football and soccer teams.

== Photo gallery ==
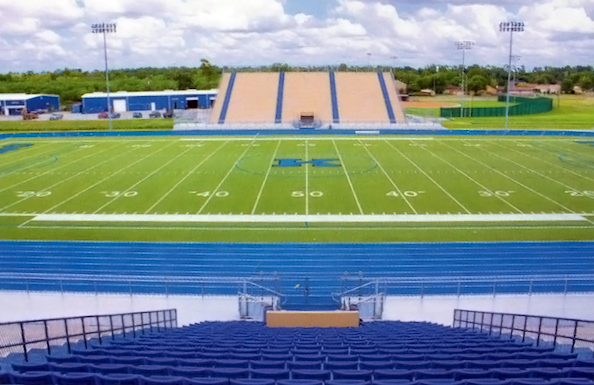
View from the home side bleachers

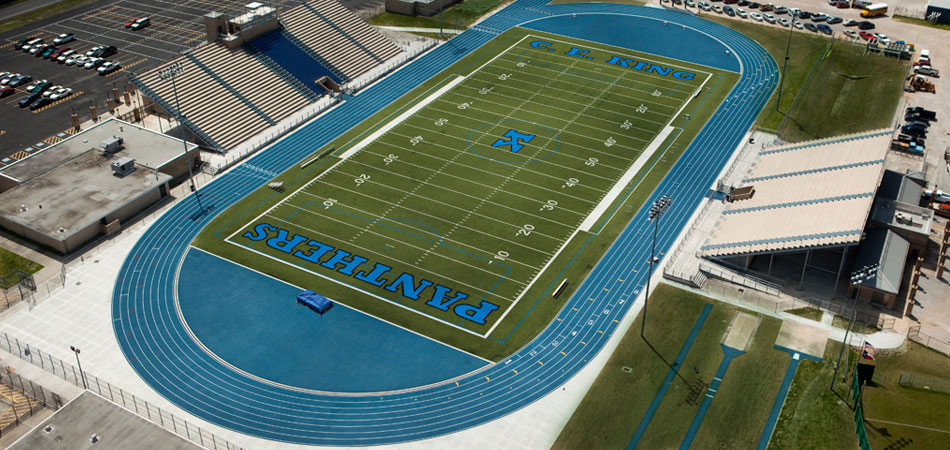
Aerial view of the stadium
