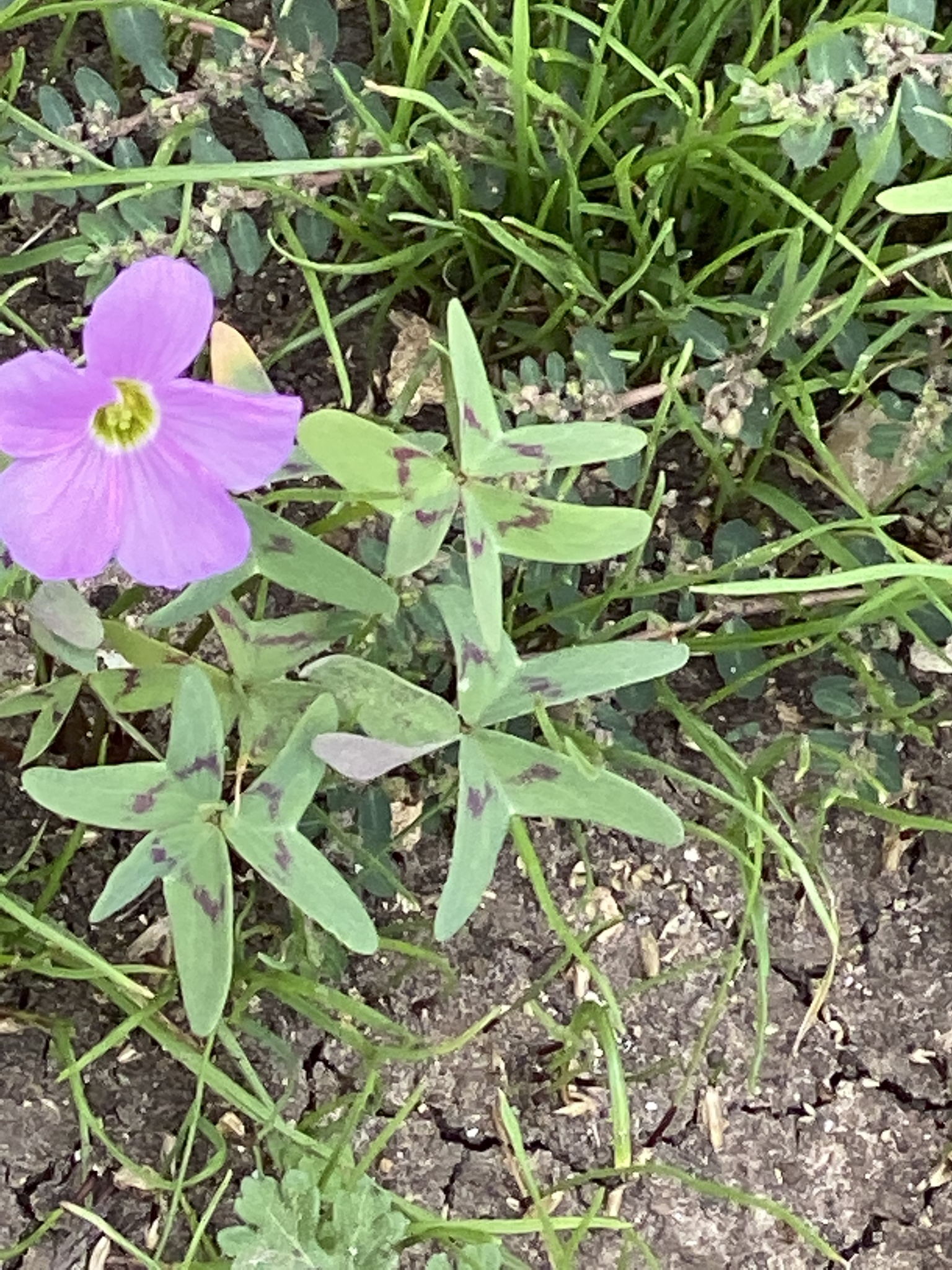
- In Eisenhower Park, San Antonio, Texas

Scientific classification
- Kingdom: Plantae
- Clade: Tracheophytes
- Clade: Angiosperms
- Clade: Eudicots
- Clade: Rosids
- Order: Oxalidales
- Family: Oxalidaceae
- Genus: Oxalis
- Species: O. drummondii

Binomial name
- Oxalis drummondii A.Gray

Synonyms
- List: Acetosella drummondii (A.Gray) Kuntze; Ionoxalis amplifolia (Trel.) Rose; Ionoxalis drummondii Rose; Ionoxalis madrensis Rose ex Small; Ionoxalis vespertilionis Small; Oxalis amplifolia (Trel.) R.Knuth; Oxalis divergens var. amplifolia Trel.; Oxalis incisa Denton; Oxalis leonis R.Knuth; Oxalis vespertilionis Torr. & A.Gray

= Oxalis drummondii =

Species of plant

Oxalis drummondii, the large-leaf woodsorrel or Drummond's wood-sorrel, is a species of flowering plant in the family Oxalidaceae. It is native to central and southern Texas, and northern Mexico. A tuberous geophyte reaching 8 in (20 cm), it is typically found growing in calcareous or sandy soils, in open woods, shrublands, and grasslands.
