= Sheldon Lake State Park and Environmental Learning Center =

State park in Texas, United States

- Sheldon Lake State Park
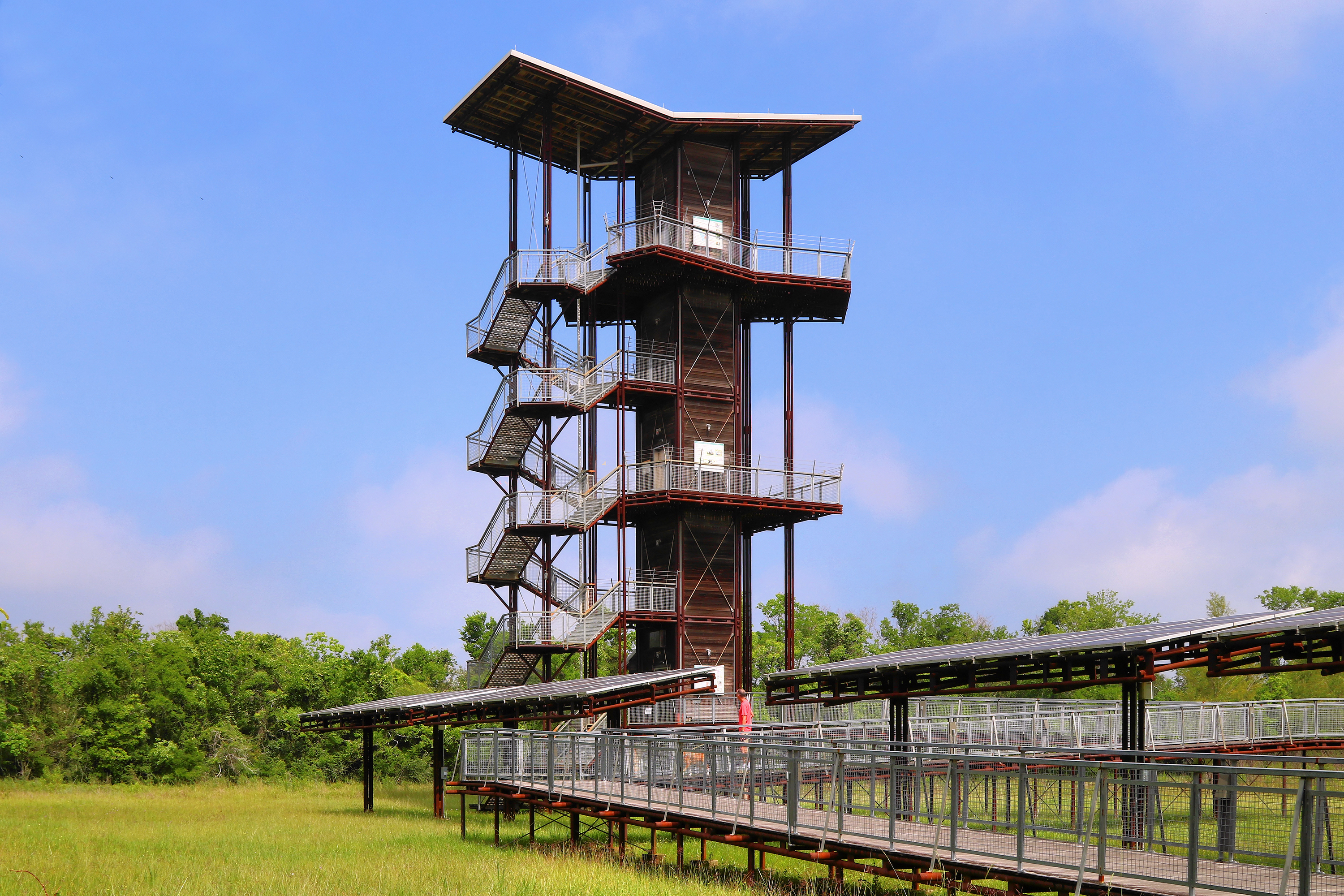
- The John Jacob Observation Tower

- Location within Texas Location within the United States
- Location: Houston, Harris County, Texas
- Nearest city: Jacinto City, Texas
- Coordinates: 29°52.22′N 95°10.37′W
- Area: 2,789 acres (1,129 ha)
- Established: 1955
- Visitors: 51,166 (in 2025)
- Governing body: Texas Parks and Wildlife Department
- Website: Official site

Sheldon Lake State Park and Environmental Learning Center is a 2,789 acres (1,129 ha) state park and outdoor education facility in northeast Harris County, Texas, United States located along Sheldon Lake reservoir. It is managed by the Texas Parks and Wildlife Department.

== History ==
The federal government constructed the reservoir on Carpenter's Bayou in 1942 in order to support growing war-related industries along the Houston Ship Channel. The Texas Parks and Wildlife Department acquired the reservoir in 1952 to provide a refuge for migratory waterfowl, a public fishing lake and a fish hatchery. It opened in 1955 as the Sheldon Wildlife Management Area. The hatchery closed in 1975, and the land began to revert naturally to forest, ponds and marshes. The site was designated a state park in 1984.

== Features ==
The park features recreational opportunities including group camping, picnic areas, hiking trails, wildlife viewing, fishing, and an environmental learning center. Alternative energy technologies and green building techniques were used during construction of many of the parks structures, including the Pond Center, an open-entry pavilion the formerly housed the site's office, lab, and garage.

The John Jacob Observation Tower is an 82-foot wheelchair-accessible structure, allowing park visitors opportunities to view the surrounding wetlands and prairie, as well as the skyline of downtown Houston.

== Nature ==
=== Animals ===
Animals here include white-tailed deer, American alligator, common raccoon, Virginia opossum, coyote and swamp rabbit. More than 20 species of ducks, geese and other waterfowl spend time here. Look for heron and egret rookeries.

=== Plants ===
Today, you’ll see grasses, woody plants and trees such as water oak, loblolly pine, bald cypress, eastern redcedar and American sycamore. The marsh, lake and ponds are home to many water plants, including flowering American white waterlily.

== See also ==
- List of Texas state parks
