= C.E. King High School =

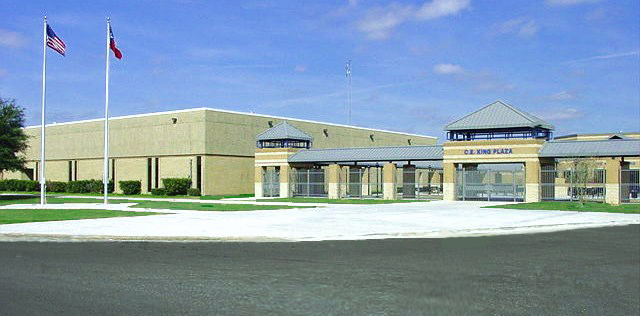

Location
- 11433 East Sam Houston Pkwy N Houston, Harris County, Texas 77044; United States
- Coordinates: 29.8485°N 95.2068°W

Information
- Type: Public
- Established: 1954
- School district: Sheldon Independent School District
- Principal: Jillian Howard
- Teaching staff: 206.84 (FTE)
- Grades: 9-12
- Enrollment: 3,670 (2023–2024)
- Student to teacher ratio: 17.74
- Campus type: Suburban
- Colors: Royal Blue, White
- Mascot: Panther
- Newspaper: The Panther Prowl
- Yearbook: The Panther
- Website: C.E. King High School Homepage

C.E. King High School is a secondary school located in unincorporated Harris County, Texas, United States that serves grades 9 through 12. It is the only high school in the Sheldon Independent School District. The school serves unincorporated areas of northeast Harris County including the Sheldon CDP and several nearby communities (Beaumont Place, Houmont Park) and subdivisions.

As of 2013, C.E. King High School is rated "Met Standard" by the Texas Education Agency.

== History ==
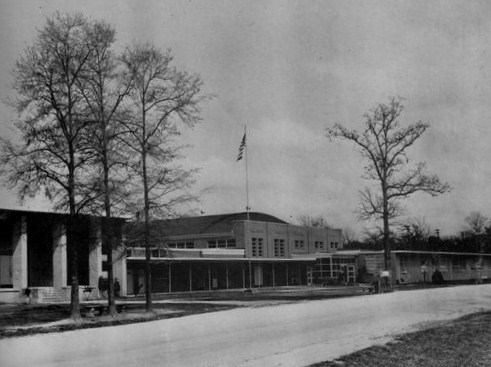
Former C.E. King Junior-Senior High School, now C.E. King Middle School

In 1954, Houston real estate investor Cortes Ewing King donated a 54-acre tract to the Sheldon Independent School District. The district used the donated land to construct a Junior-Senior High School and named it after him. C.E. King Junior-Senior High School was located on the western half of the donated land where C.E. King Middle School currently stands.

The school was partially destroyed by fire in 1955, and in the same year, C.E. King Junior-Senior High School had its first graduating class of 11 students. In 1965, the Junior-Senior High School was renamed C.E. King Junior High School and a new C.E. King High School building on 8540 C.E. King Parkway opened on the land adjacent to it.

In 1972, the former Parkway Elementary opened next to the high school on 10 acres donated to the district by the Parkway Subdivision. That campus later closed and was annexed as part of the high school.

A building addition to C.E. King High School was completed in 1970. The auditorium was added in 1973. Classroom additions were made to the main building and the annex in 1978. The gym, field house, and wellness center were added in the late 1980s early 1990s. An administrative addition was completed in 1999. A two-story building near the tennis courts was completed in 2002. In 2003 the plaza and new cafeteria were opened. Slight addition to the cafeteria was made in 2008. The stadium was refurbished in 2009.

In 2020, a new C.E. King High School located on the corner of Sam Houston Parkway and Garrett Road was opened as part of the 2016 Bond. Also, as part of that bond, the building on C.E. King Parkway will be converted into the new C.E. King Middle School.

== Academics ==
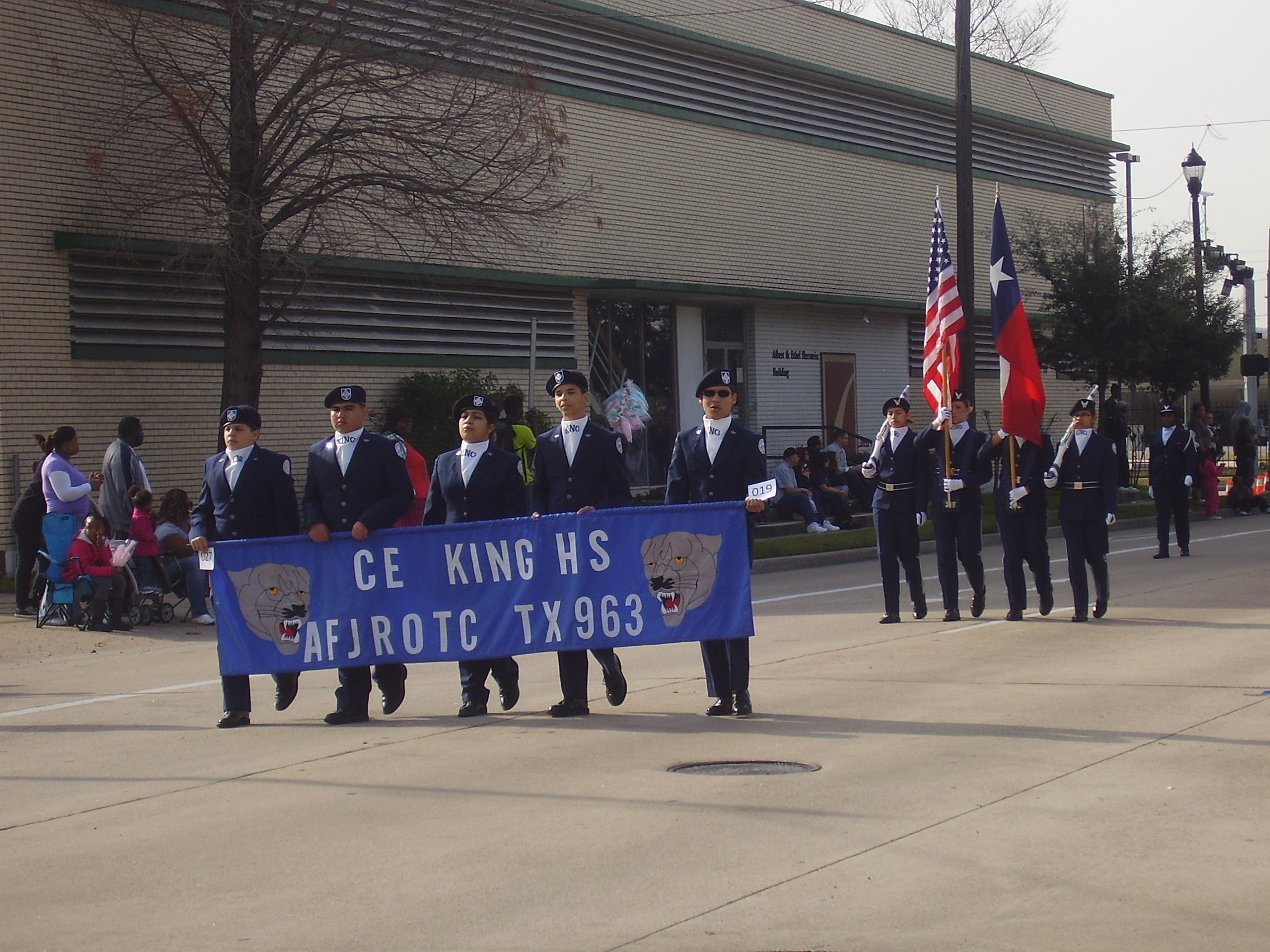
C.E. King JROTC at the 2013 Martin Luther King Day Parade in Midtown Houston

=== Academies ===
The school is organized into six academies to allow for a more personalized attention to students by creating a smaller learning environment. This is based after the house system of smaller learning communities. In this system, each student is assigned to an academy in which they will work with an Assistant Principal-Counselor pair for all four years at the school. The district believes this model will make a large school feel smaller as well as help students choose a career in the fields they are interested in.

- Agricultural Careers in Education (ACE) Academy
- Sheldon Early College High School (ECHS) Academy
- Future Business Leaders (FBL) Academy
- Medicine, Experience, Dedication (MED) Academy
- Public Service Leaders (PSL) Academy
- Science, Technology, Engineering, Arts, and Mathematics (STEAM) Academy

== Notable alumni ==
- Ulysses Bentley IV, college football running back for the Ole Miss Rebels
- Joseph Blair, former professional basketball player, current NBA assistant coach
- Larry Brune, former CFL and NFL defensive back
- Trayveon Williams, running back for the Cincinnati Bengals
- George Wright, former defensive tackle for the Baltimore Colts and Super Bowl V champion
