= Dwight D. Eisenhower Park (Houston) =

Public park in Harris County, Texas

- Interactive map of Dwight D. Eisenhower Park
- Type: public park
- Location: Harris County, Texas
- Coordinates: 29°54′25″N 95°08′01″W
- Area: 682 acres (2.76 km^{2})
- Open: Year round

Dwight D. Eisenhower Park is a park located in Harris County, Texas on the south coast of Lake Houston

It is owned and managed by Harris County Precinct One, which acquired the park from the City of Houston in 1995.

== Recreation ==
The park is popular for fishing, especially for rainbow trout. There are picnic areas, a playground, and nature trails.
