= Lake Houston =

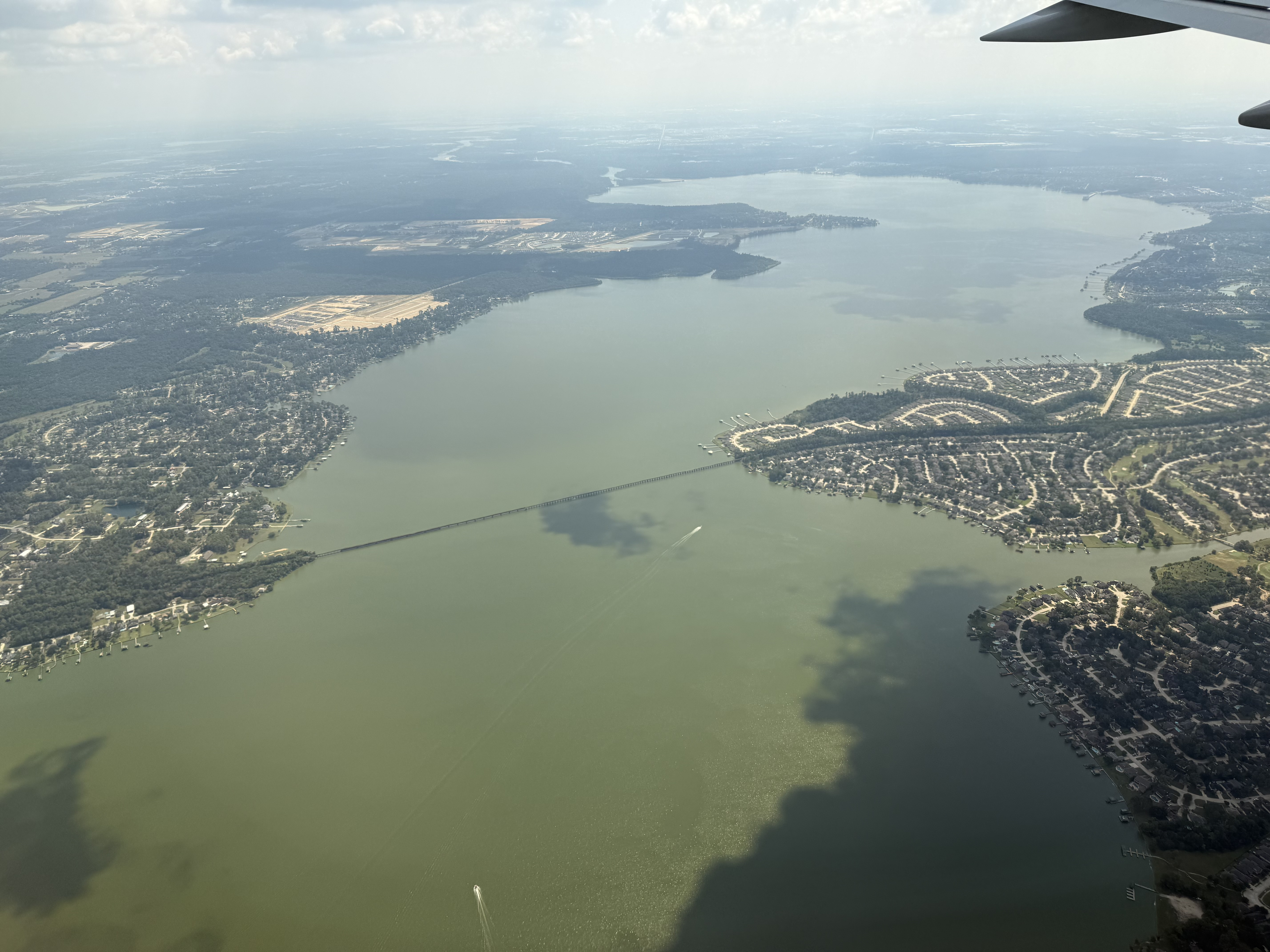
- Aerial view south across Lake Houston

- Location within Texas Location within the United States
- Location: 15 miles (24 km) northeast of downtown Houston, Texas
- Coordinates: 29°57.53′N 95°8.93′W
- Type: Municipal water reservoir
- Primary inflows: west fork of the San Jacinto River
- Primary outflows: San Jacinto River
- Basin countries: United States
- Surface area: 11,854 acres (4,797 ha)
- Max. depth: 45 ft (14 m)
- Water volume: 160,000 acre⋅ft (0.20 km^{3})
- Surface elevation: 44 ft (13 m)

Lake Houston is a reservoir on the San Jacinto River, 15 miles (24 km) northeast of downtown Houston, Texas, United States. The reservoir is the primary municipal water supply for the city of Houston.

== Location and creation ==
Situated between the communities of Kingwood, Atascocita and Humble on the west bank, Sheldon on the south, and Crosby and Huffman on the east. An earthen dam spans a portion of the southern bank along Dwight D. Eisenhower Park.

The reservoir was created in 1953 when the City of Houston built the dam to impound a reservoir to replace Sheldon Lake, then the primary source of water for the city. The city sold Sheldon Lake to the Texas Parks and Wildlife Department for use as a waterfowl sanctuary and public fishing site.

The City of Houston annexed the Lake Houston area and a 22.5 miles (36.2 km) canal in 1956.

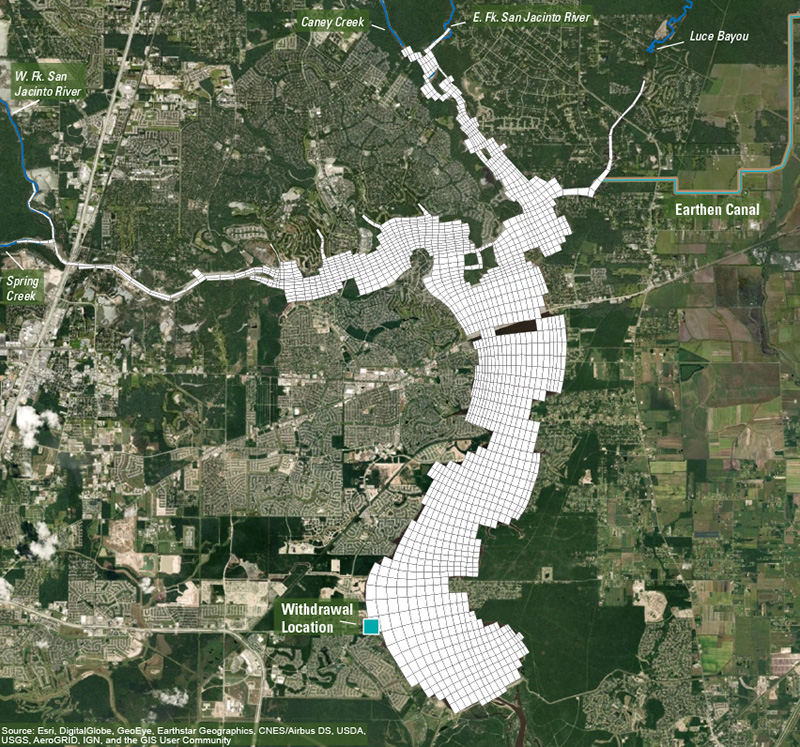

== Fish and plant populations ==
Lake Houston has been stocked with species of fish intended to improve the utility of the reservoir for recreational fishing. Fish present in Lake Houston include largemouth bass, white bass, white crappie, blue catfish, and bluegill.

== Water quality ==
Lake Houston serves as the primary water supply for the surrounding areas. In 2005, the water quality of Lake Houston was monitored through the installation of two USGS monitoring stations within the Lake Houston watershed. These stations evaluate the impact of the watershed on water quality.

== Recreational uses ==
Boating and fishing are both popular recreational uses of the lake. At the northern end of the lake, Lake Houston Wilderness Park has rental cabins, facilities for camping, a kayak launch and trails for hiking and biking.
