= Lake Houston Wilderness Park =

Park in New Caney, Texas, United States

- Interactive map of Lake Houston Wilderness Park
- Type: Municipal (Houston, Texas)
- Location: New Caney, Texas
- Coordinates: 30°07′17″N 95°09′32″W
- Area: 4,786.6 acres (19 km^{2})
- Created: 2006
- Operator: Houston Parks and Recreation Department

Lake Houston Wilderness Park is a wooded parkland that encompasses 5,000 acres, located in New Caney, Montgomery County, Texas and owned and overseen by the Houston Parks and Recreation Department.

The park is home to a variety of wildlife, including woodpeckers and other birds, deer, snakes, bats, and several types of fish, with alligators occasionally seen in the swamp. The nature center features animals such as young alligators, snakes, and spotted gar.

Facilities of the park include lodging cabins, an archery range, canoeing and a nature center, as well as over 20 miles of hiking, biking, and equestrian trails available inside the park. Each trail offers a different range of difficulty and distance. It is the only park of the Houston Parks and Recreation Department that has overnight camping and lodging; with A-frame cabins that have running water and electricity installed, as well as cabins without these amenities. The park is pet-friendly in tent camping areas and throughout the grounds, though pets are not allowed inside cabins. Visitors are welcome to explore by bike or on horseback, but must bring their own. All fishing in the park is catch and release only.

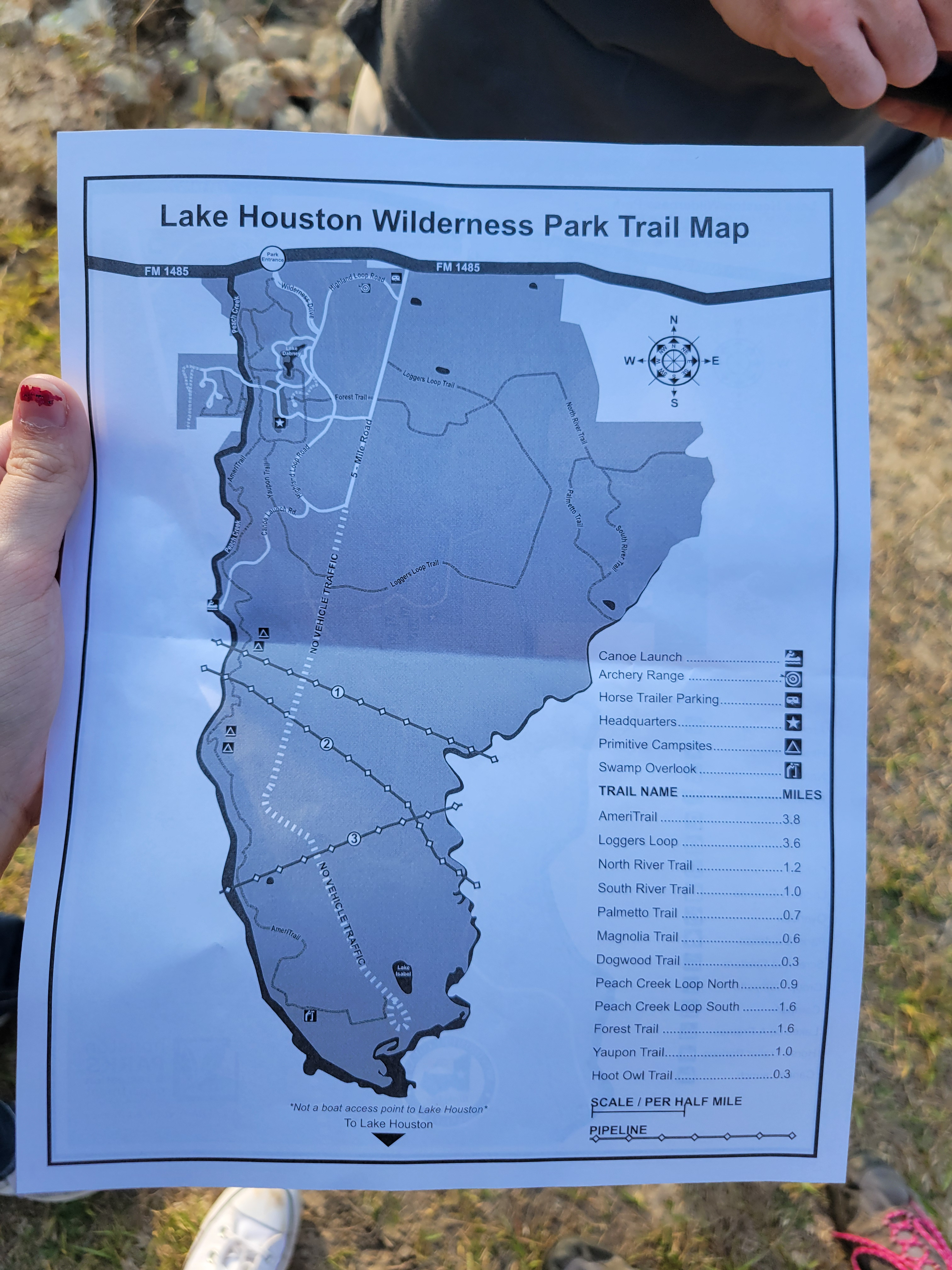
Map of the facilities, trails, bodies of water, and cabins.

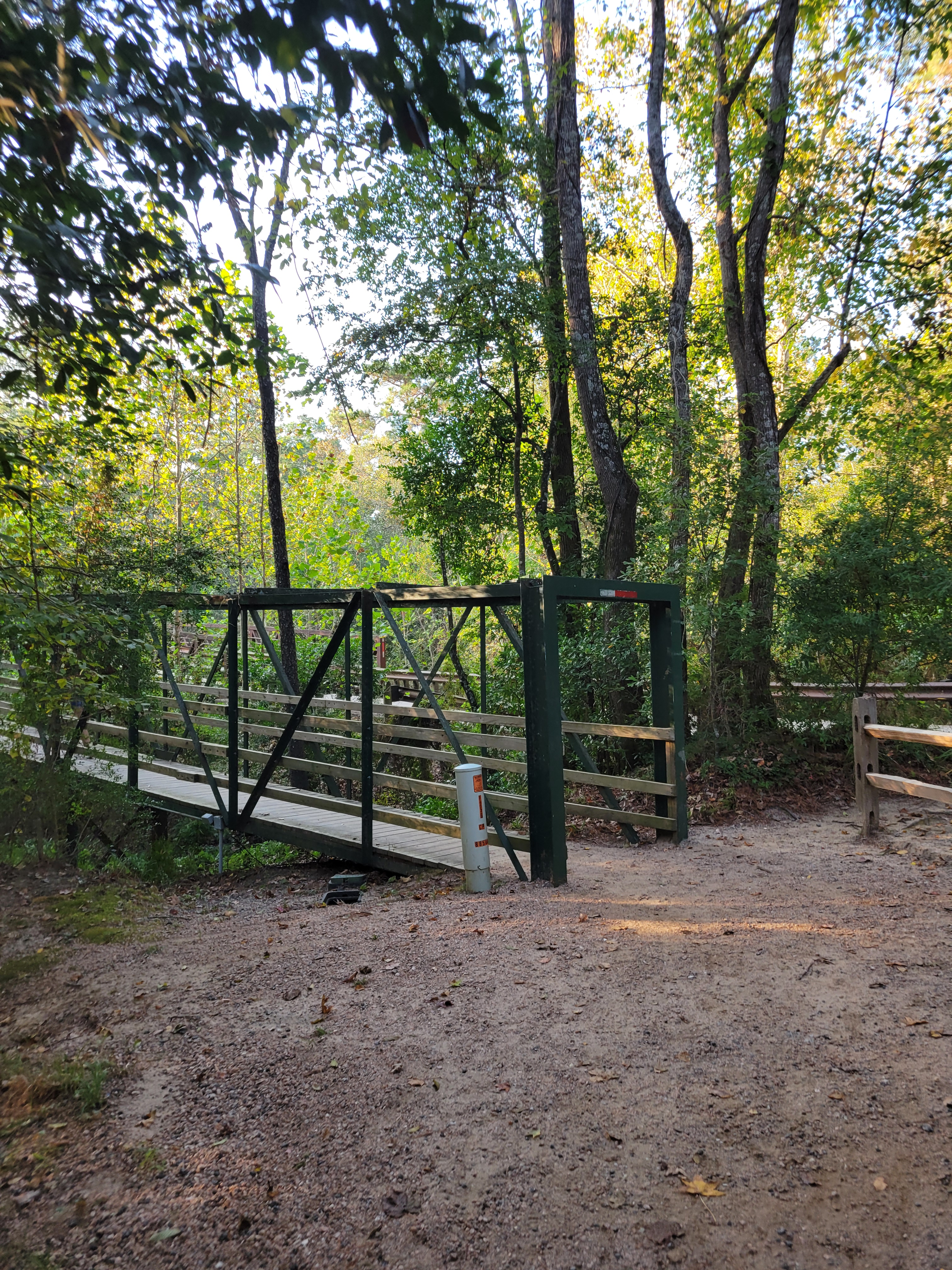
Photo of the bridge people use to cross over Peach Creek.
