= Dwight D. Eisenhower Park (San Antonio) =

Park in Texas

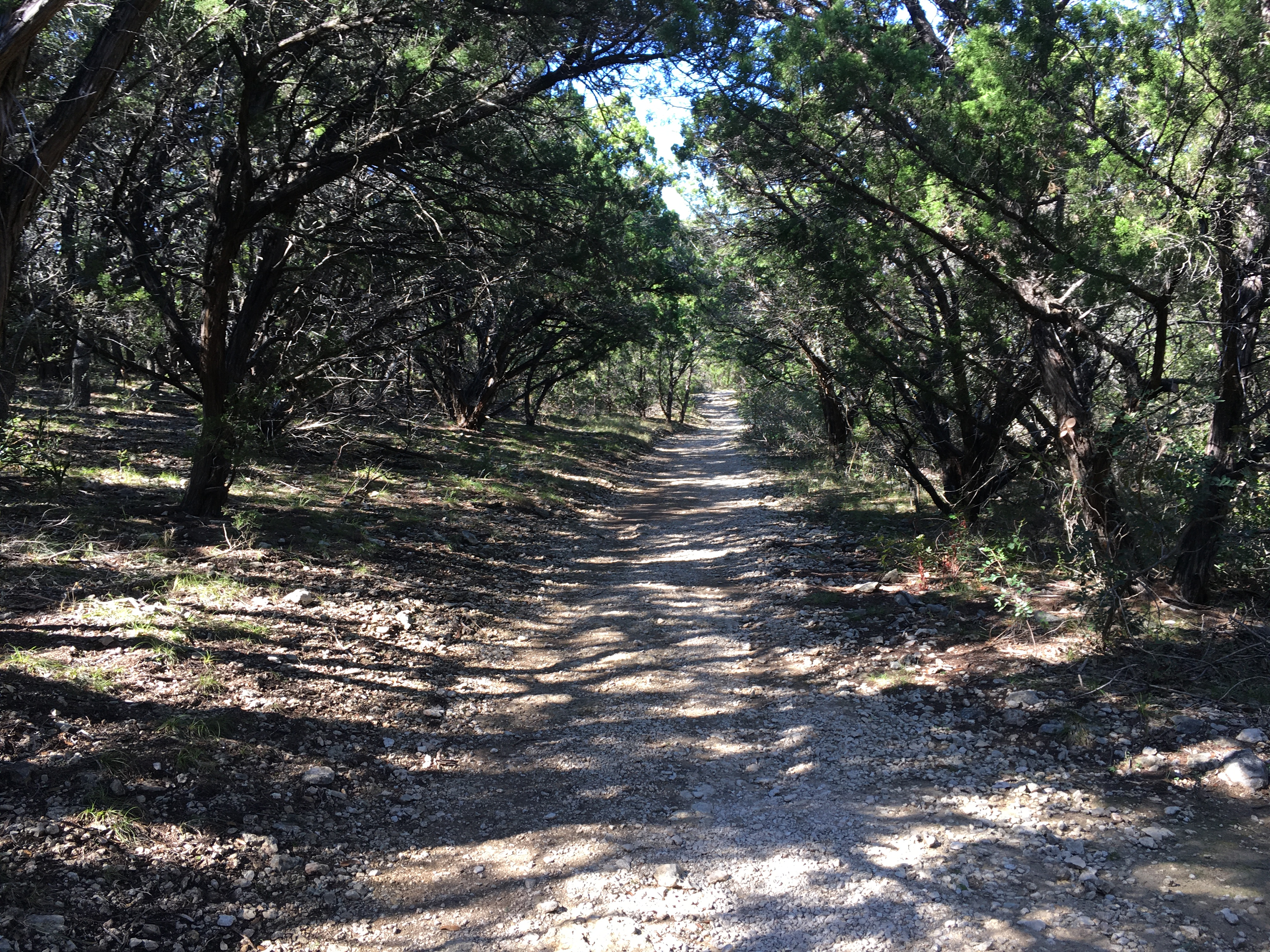
- Interactive map of Dwight D. Eisenhower Park
- Type: public park
- Location: San Antonio, Texas; United States
- Coordinates: 29°37′20″N 98°34′55″W
- Area: 317 acres (1.28 km^{2})
- Open: Year round

Dwight D. Eisenhower Park, also known as Eisenhower City Park, is a park located in the Texas Hill Country outside San Antonio. It is managed by the City of San Antonio Parks and Recreation Department.

== History ==
The park was formerly part of the US Army training ground Camp Bullis. It was opened to the public in 1988. The park is named after U.S. President Dwight D. Eisenhower who was originally from Texas and was an army commander at nearby Fort Sam Houston.

== Recreation ==
The park is popular for hiking; there are over 5 miles (8 km) of trails. There are also picnic areas, playground, camp sites and nature trails.

Wildlife such as white-tail deer, armadillos, raccoons, skunks and others live in the park. It is also popular for bird watching.
