= Carpenters Bayou =

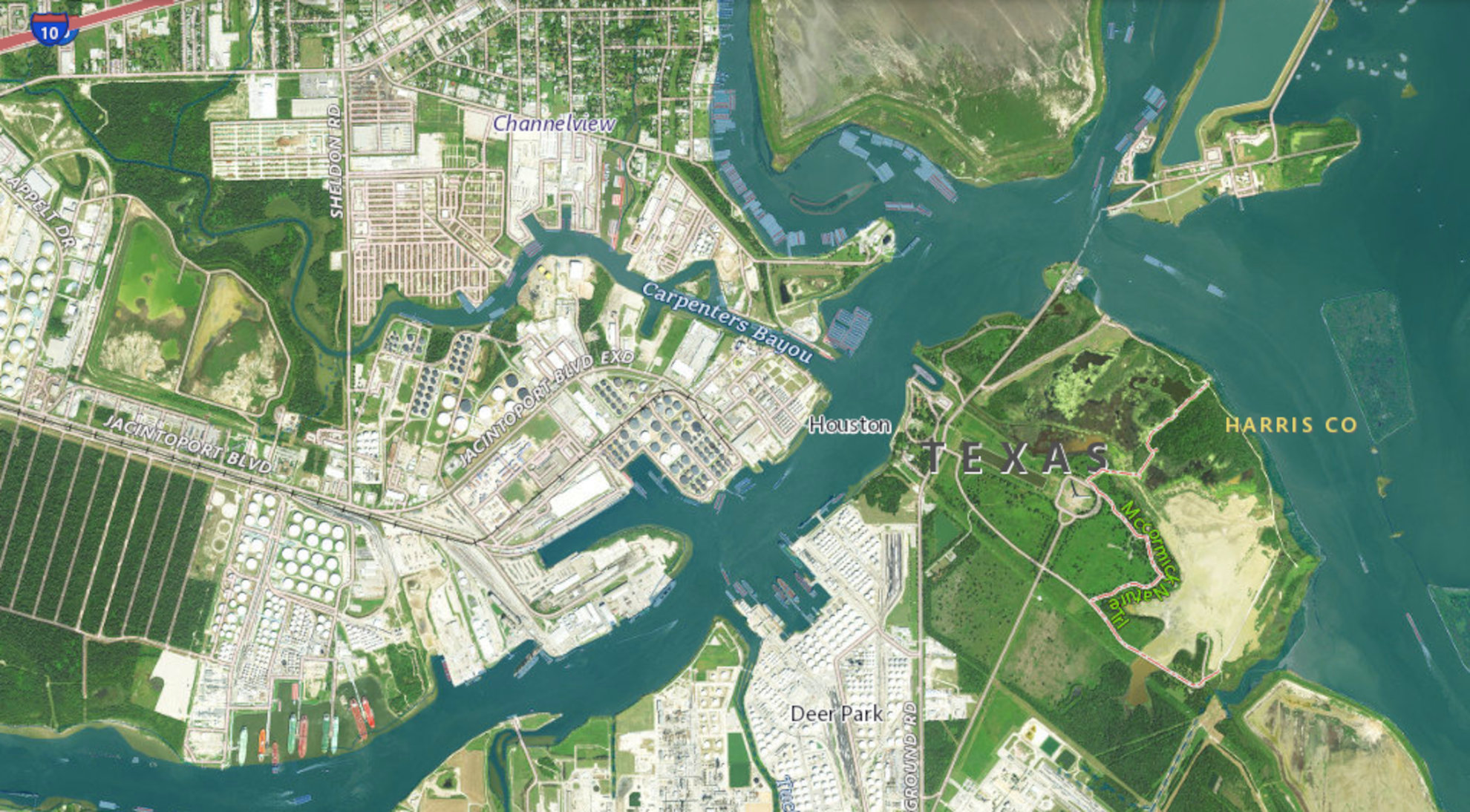
- Carpenters Bayou at Harris County, Texas

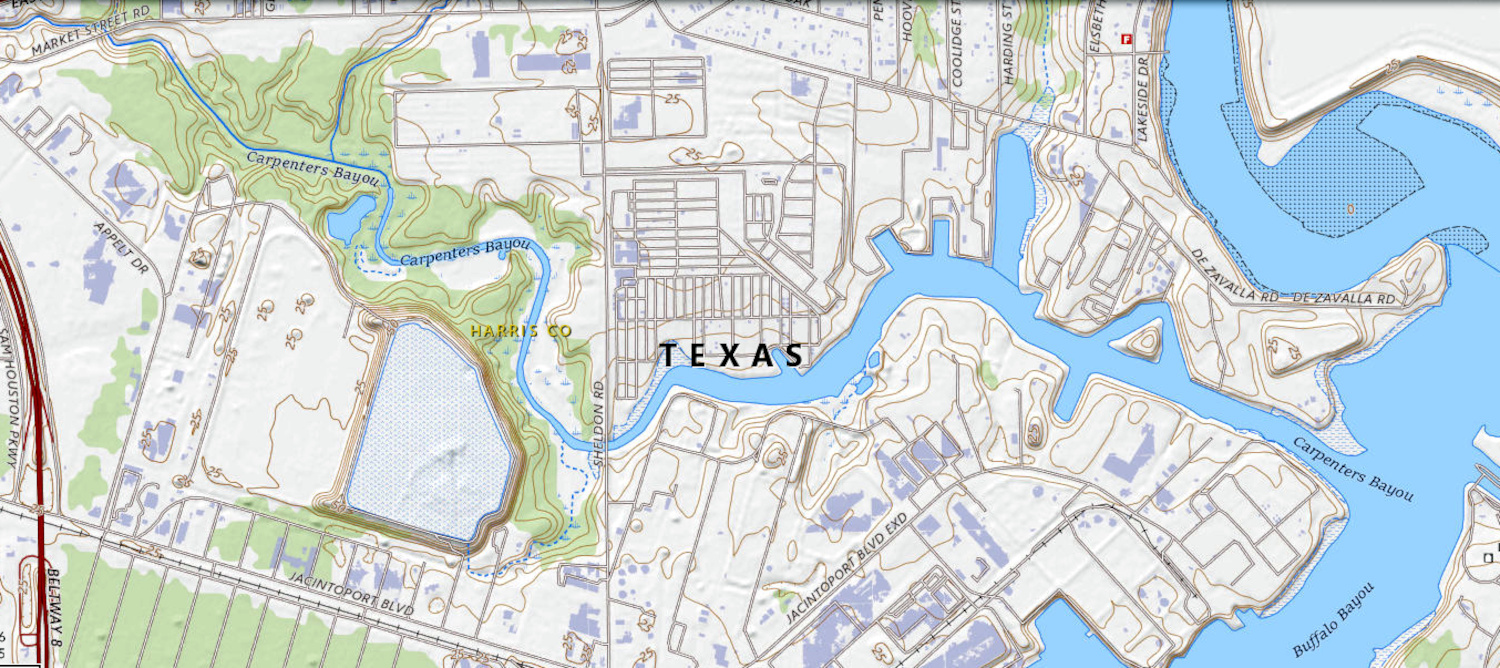
- Carpenters Bayou on Houston Ship Channel

- Location within State of Texas Carpenters Bayou (the United States)
- Nickname: Houston Ship Channel

Location
- Country: United States
- U.S. State: Texas
- County: Harris County, Texas
- Cities: Channelview, Houston

Physical characteristics
- Source: Sheldon, Texas
  - location: Sheldon Lake
  - coordinates: 29.8541131°N 95.1674320°W
- Mouth: Channelview, Texas
  - location: Buffalo Bayou
  - coordinates: 29.75606°N 95.09438°W
- Length: 44 mi (71 km)
- Basin size: 25 sq mi (65 km^{2})
- Width
  - minimum: 125 ft (38 m)
  - average: 165 ft (50 m)
  - maximum: 430 ft (130 m)
- Depth
  - minimum: 2 ft (0.61 m)
  - average: 11 ft (3.4 m)
  - maximum: 15 ft (4.6 m)

Basin features
- River system: San Jacinto River
- Landmarks: Lorenzo de Zavala; Lynch's Ferry; San Jacinto State Historic Site
- Population: 70,721 (2020 Census)
- Waterbodies: Galveston Bay; Gulf of Mexico
- Inland ports: Port of Galveston; Port of Houston
- GNIS feature ID: 1372946

Carpenters Bayou rises at the south end of Sheldon Reservoir in southeastern Harris County (29°51′N 95°10′W), Texas, United States. The bayou waterway routes southeast for about twelve miles until it joins Buffalo Bayou at the San Jacinto Battleground State Historic Site (29°45′N 95°06′W).

== History ==
The bayou's name commemorates David Carpenter, a partner of William Harris as one of Stephen F. Austin's "Old Three Hundred" families of Austin's Colony in what later became Texas. Carpenter and Harris received a sitio of land in present Harris County, Texas on August 16, 1824, which fronted on Carpenter's Bayou in southeastern Harris County, near San Felipe de Austin. Carpenter was a blacksmith, and a single man at the time of the grant. He may have died as early as 1828, the year that Noah Smithwick bought his blacksmith's outfit in San Felipe.

== See also ==
- List of rivers of Texas
