= Sheldon Lake =

Reservoir on Carpenters Bayou in Texas, United States

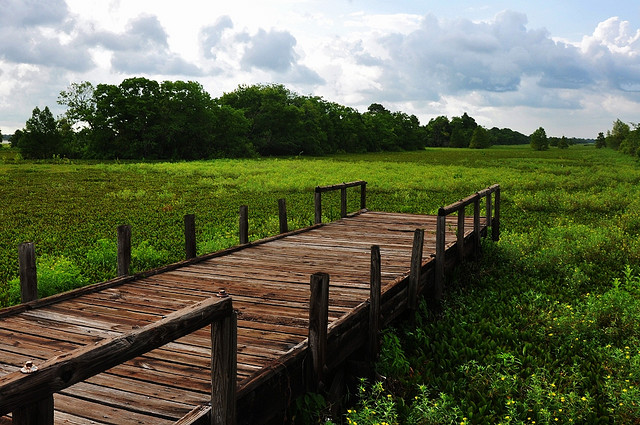
- Sheldon Reservoir Sea of Grass

- Location within Texas Location within the United States
- Location: Harris County, Texas
- Coordinates: 29°52.22′N 95°10.37′W
- Type: reservoir
- Primary inflows: Carpenters Bayou
- Primary outflows: Carpenters Bayou
- Catchment area: 4 sq mi (10 km^{2})
- Basin countries: United States
- Managing agency: Texas Parks and Wildlife Department
- Built: 1943
- Surface area: 1,230 acres (500 ha)
- Max. depth: 10 ft (3.0 m)
- Water volume: 5,354 acre⋅ft (0.006604 km^{3})
- Shore length^{1}: 13.1 mi (21.08 km)
- Surface elevation: 47 ft (14 m)
- ^{1} Shore length is not a well-defined measure.

Sheldon Lake is a reservoir in Sheldon Lake State Park (SLSP) located in Harris County approximately 16 mi. (26 km) northeast of downtown Houston, Texas. It is positioned within the San Jacinto River Basin, on Carpenters Bayou. It contains a variety of prairie and wetland habitats. There is a significant amount of aquatic vegetation in the lake, and populations of several species of fish are maintained for recreational fishing. Bird and nature watching are also popular activities around the lake.

== History ==
Sheldon Lake was established by the federal government in 1943 through the construction of a dam on its tributary, Carpenters Bayou. Its original purpose was to provide a source of fresh water to Houston and industries operating on the Houston Ship Channel. The City of Houston began managing the reservoir following World War II. The eastern half of Sheldon Lake was drained in the early 1950s, and the Houston West Canal was constructed to divert fresh water from Lake Houston to the city. In 1952 the Texas Parks and Wildlife Department purchased the lake and surrounding property. They established the Sheldon Wildlife Management Area in 1955, providing a public fishing and recreation area and a refuge for wildlife. A fish hatchery was also created and maintained, but was closed in 1975. The Sheldon Wildlife Management Area was designated as a state park in 1984, becoming Sheldon Lake State Park.

== Description ==
Sheldon Lake State Park has four distinct habitats: bottomland woods; restored coastal prairie; open water and marsh of the lake; and cypress swamp. These habitats are a microcosm of those found on the Upper Texas Coast.

Sheldon Lake is approximately three miles long and over a mile wide. The shoreline is mainly woody and brushy shoreline habitats. The dam itself is 10 ft. tall, composed of compacted soil. It has a yield of around 200 acre-ft/year. Before its settlement, the lake and surrounding area were composed of coastal prairies and marshlands. Restoration efforts have been implemented to restore wetlands near the lake. Habitat maintenance continues through the use of vegetation control measures such as controlled burns and planting native species.

== Fish and plant populations ==
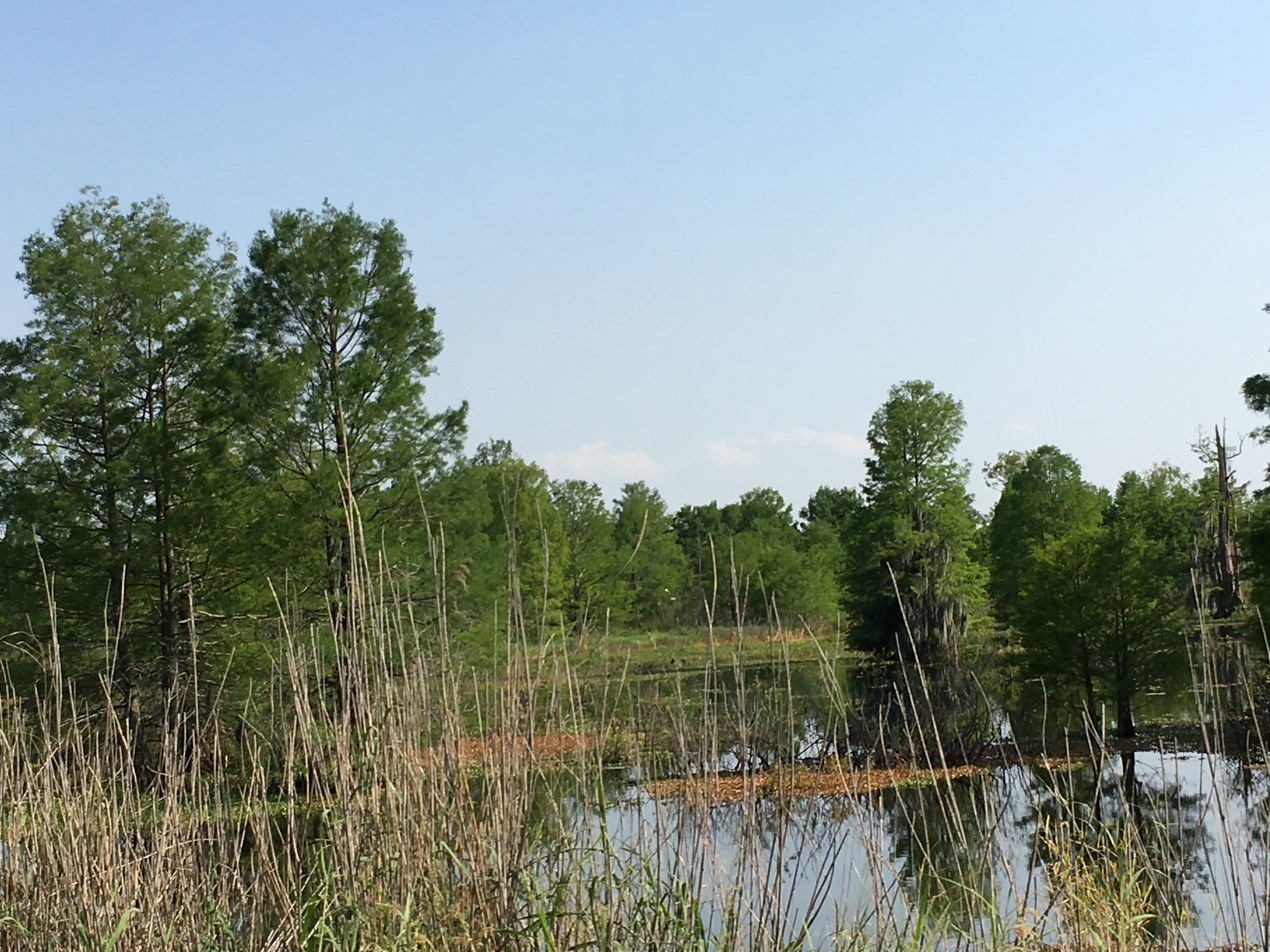
Sheldon Lake along Garrett Rd.

Sheldon Lake has been stocked with species of fish intended to improve the utility of the reservoir for recreational fishing. Fish present in Sheldon Lake include catfish, largemouth bass, crappie, bluegill, and sunfish.

There is a high level of vegetation in the lake, with several species present, including cypress trees, water lilies, arrowhead, pondweed, and coontail. Nuisance species such as hydrilla, water hyacinth, alligator weed and giant salvinia are also present. These species can create obstructions to the shoreline and make fishing difficult. Attempts at treating hydrilla and giant salvinia invasions have included herbicides and giant salvinia weevils.

== Recreational uses ==
Birdwatching and fishing are both popular recreational uses of the park. There is one boat ramp for boat access, fishing decks, and access to shoreline. There are two miles of flat trails, boardwalks, and the 82 ft. high John Jacob Observation Tower which provides higher elevation viewing.

A five-year bird census of the park was completed in July, 2006. Nearly four dozen additional bird species were added to the park's checklist. The newly revised SLSP bird checklist features 249 bird species. Each spring over 200 bird species are possible. Texas' largest inland waterbird colony can be found on 29+ spoil islands. The nonstop sight and sounds of this colony is best viewed from along the west levee. This colony is growing and now hosts over 2,200 heron, egret, roseate spoonbill, anhinga, Neotropic cormorant and ibis nests each year. Purple gallinule and least bittern also breed on the lake. Also in spring, over 22 Neotropic migrant species are reported.

Winter is the next best birding season at SLSP. Over 160 bird species are possible here in winter. Annual winter bird counts find over 90 species of wintering birds on the park in a day. Some winter specialties include ash-throated and vermilion flycatchers, fish crow, Le Conte's and grasshopper sparrows. Also American bittern, canvasback and Ross's goose. A great kiskadee over-wintered in 2005–06.

Visit Friends of Sheldon Lake SP for an updated checklist and tips for birding SLSP.

== See also ==
- Sheldon Lake State Park and Environmental Learning Center
