= Hop-clover =

Hop-clover is a common name for several different plants and may refer to:

- Trifolium:
  - Trifolium aureum
  - Trifolium campestre
  - Trifolium dubium, thought by some to be the original Shamrock
- Medicago
  - Medicago lupulina
