= Phyllonorycter medicaginella =

Scientific classification
- Domain: Eukaryota
- Kingdom: Animalia
- Phylum: Arthropoda
- Class: Insecta
- Order: Lepidoptera
- Family: Gracillariidae
- Genus: Phyllonorycter
- Species: P. medicaginella

Binomial name
- Phyllonorycter medicaginella (Gerasimov, 1930)

Synonyms
- Lithocolletis medicaginella Gerasimov, 1930

Species of moth

Phyllonorycter medicaginella is a moth of the family Gracillariidae. It is found from Denmark and Poland to Belgium, the Alps, Bulgaria and Ukraine.

The larvae feed on Medicago falcata, Medicago lupulina, Medicago sativa, Melilotus alba, Melilotus officinalis, Ononis spinosa, Trifolium dubium, Trifolium campestre and Trifolium repens. They mine the leaves of their host plant.
