= Yellow woodsorrel =

Yellow woodsorrel may refer to any member of the woodsorrel genus (Oxalis) with yellow flowers (also called "yellow-sorrels"), but especially:

- Oxalis corniculata (creeping woodsorrel), a low-lying species
- Oxalis dillenii (southern yellow woodsorrel), an erect species with hairy fruits
- Oxalis grandis (large yellow woodsorrel)
- Oxalis priceae (tufted yellow woodsorrel)
- Oxalis stricta (common yellow woodsorrel), an erect species with hairless fruits
- Oxalis suksdorfii (western yellow woodsorrel)
