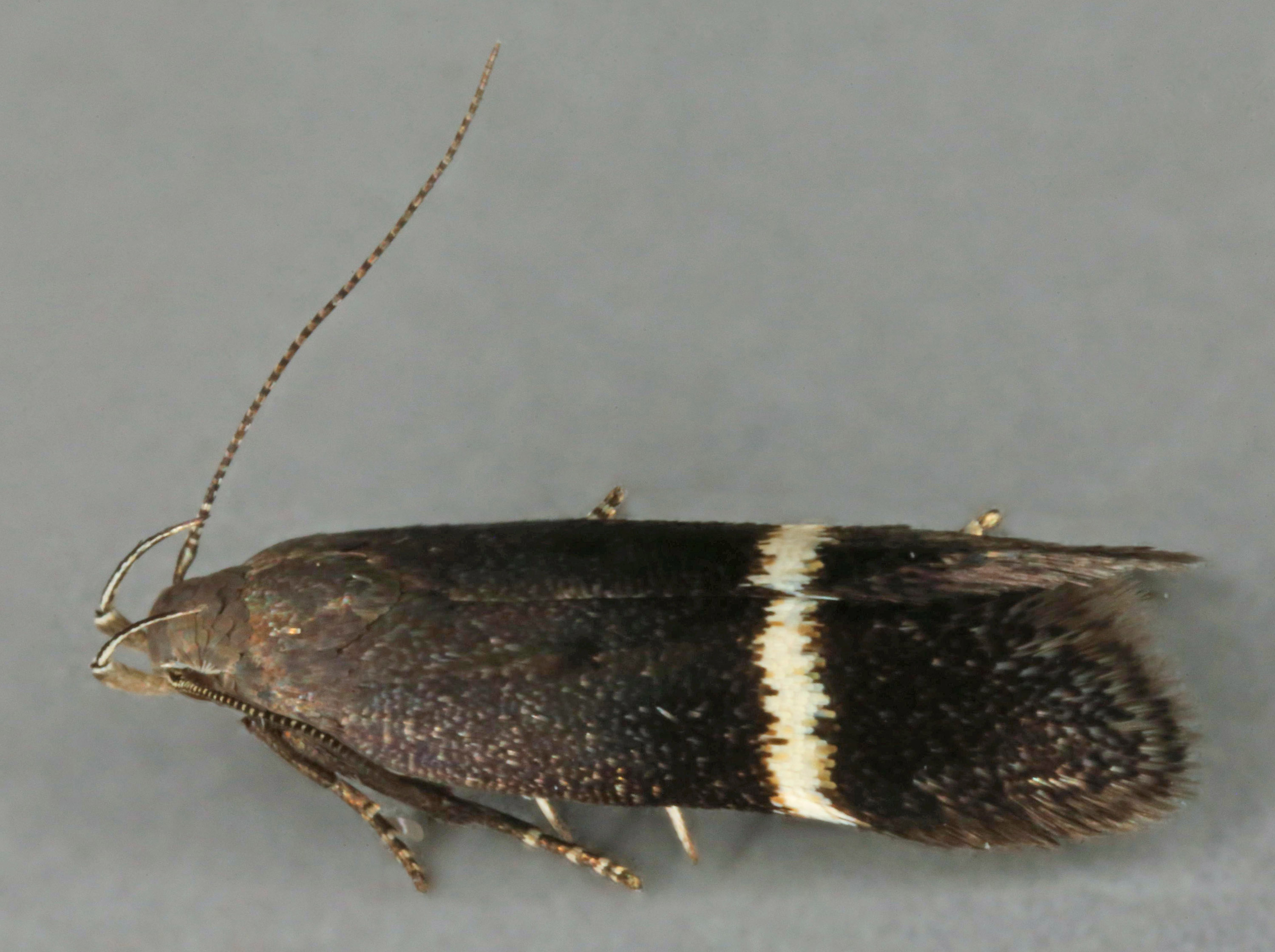
- Syncopacma taeniolella, Bagillt, North Wales

Scientific classification
- Kingdom: Animalia
- Phylum: Arthropoda
- Clade: Pancrustacea
- Class: Insecta
- Order: Lepidoptera
- Family: Gelechiidae
- Genus: Syncopacma
- Species: S. taeniolella

Binomial name
- Syncopacma taeniolella (Zeller, 1839)

Synonyms
- Gelechia taeniolella Zeller, 1839; Stomopteryx taeniolella

= Syncopacma taeniolella =

Species of moth

Syncopacma taeniolella is a moth of the family Gelechiidae. It is found in most of Europe.

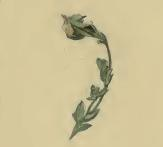
A sprig of Trifolium micranthum with leaves united by larva

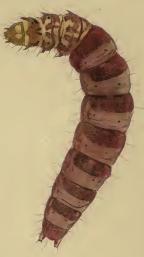
Larva

The wingspan is 10–13 mm. The forewings are bronzy-black, somewhat lighter basally; a nearly straight narrow white fascia beyond middle. Hindwings are fuscous, darker posteriorly. Under-surface with white fascia distinct across forewings and forming a costal spot on hindwings. The larva is pale ochreous-yellowish; 3-12 with broad dull red transverse bands, on 3 and 4 somewhat interrupted; head yellow-brown; plate of 2 yellow-brown, posteriorly blackish-marked

Adults are on wing in July.

The larvae feed on Lotus corniculatus, Lotus uliginosus, Medicago and Trifolium species. They initially mine the leaves of their host plant. Larvae can be found in May and June.
