= Slender trefoil =

Slender trefoil is a common name for multiple plants and may refer to:

- Lotus tenuis, native to western and southern Europe and southwest Asia
- Trifolium micranthum, native to central and western Europe
