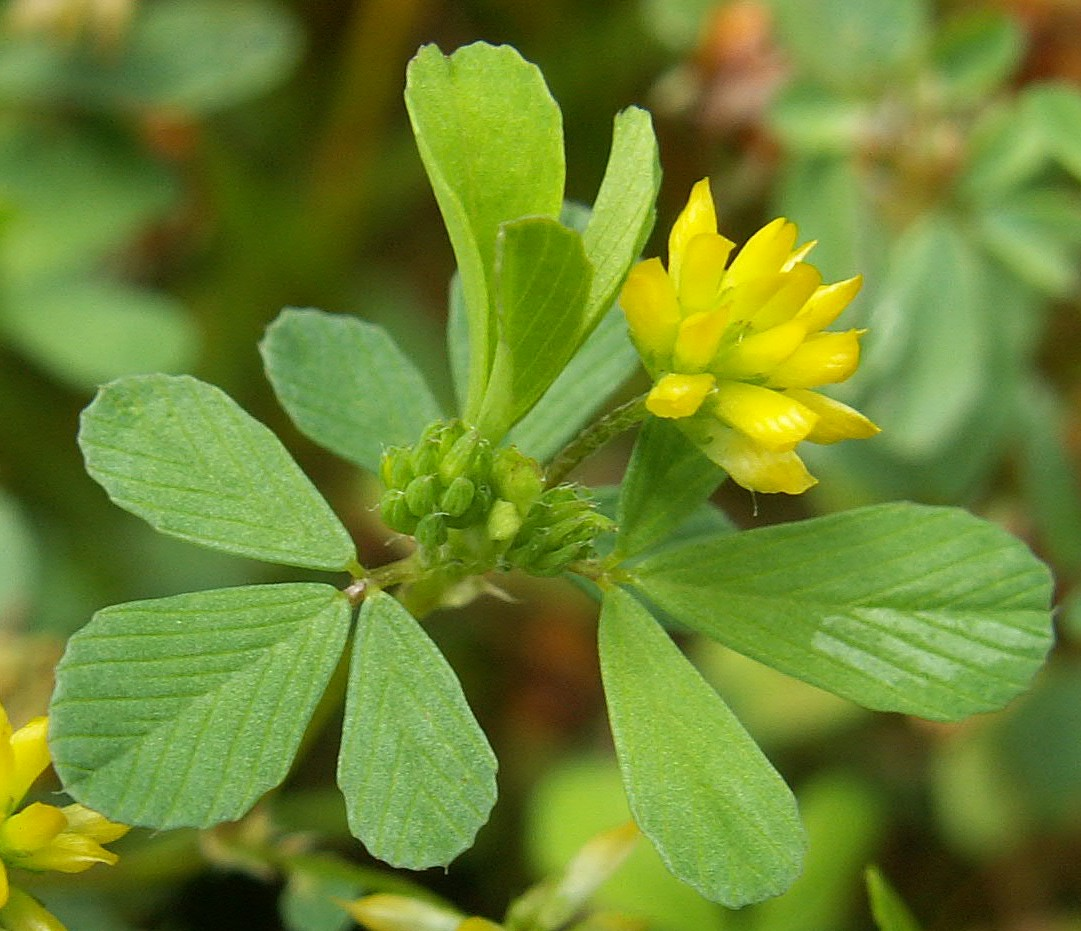

Scientific classification
- Kingdom: Plantae
- Clade: Embryophytes
- Clade: Tracheophytes
- Clade: Spermatophytes
- Clade: Angiosperms
- Clade: Eudicots
- Clade: Rosids
- Order: Fabales
- Family: Fabaceae
- Subfamily: Faboideae
- Genus: Trifolium
- Species: T. dubium

Binomial name
- Trifolium dubium Sibth.

Synonyms
- Amarenus flavus C. Presl; Chrysaspis dubia (Sibth.) Desv.; Chrysaspis dubia (Sibth.) E.H.Greene; Trifolium filiforme sensu auct.; Trifolium flavum C. Presl; Trifolium luteolum Schur; Trifolium minus Sm.; Trifolium praticola Sennen; Trifolium procumbens "L., p.p."; Trifolium procumbens sensu auct.

= Trifolium dubium =

Species of flowering plant

Trifolium dubium, the lesser trefoil, suckling clover, little hop clover or lesser hop trefoil, is a flowering plant in the pea and clover family Fabaceae. This species is generally accepted as the primary plant to represent the traditional Irish shamrock.

It is native to Europe, but can be found in many parts of the world as an introduced species.

It is probably an allotetraploid with 2n=32 that arose from the crossing of Trifolium campestre and T. micranthum.

== Gallery ==
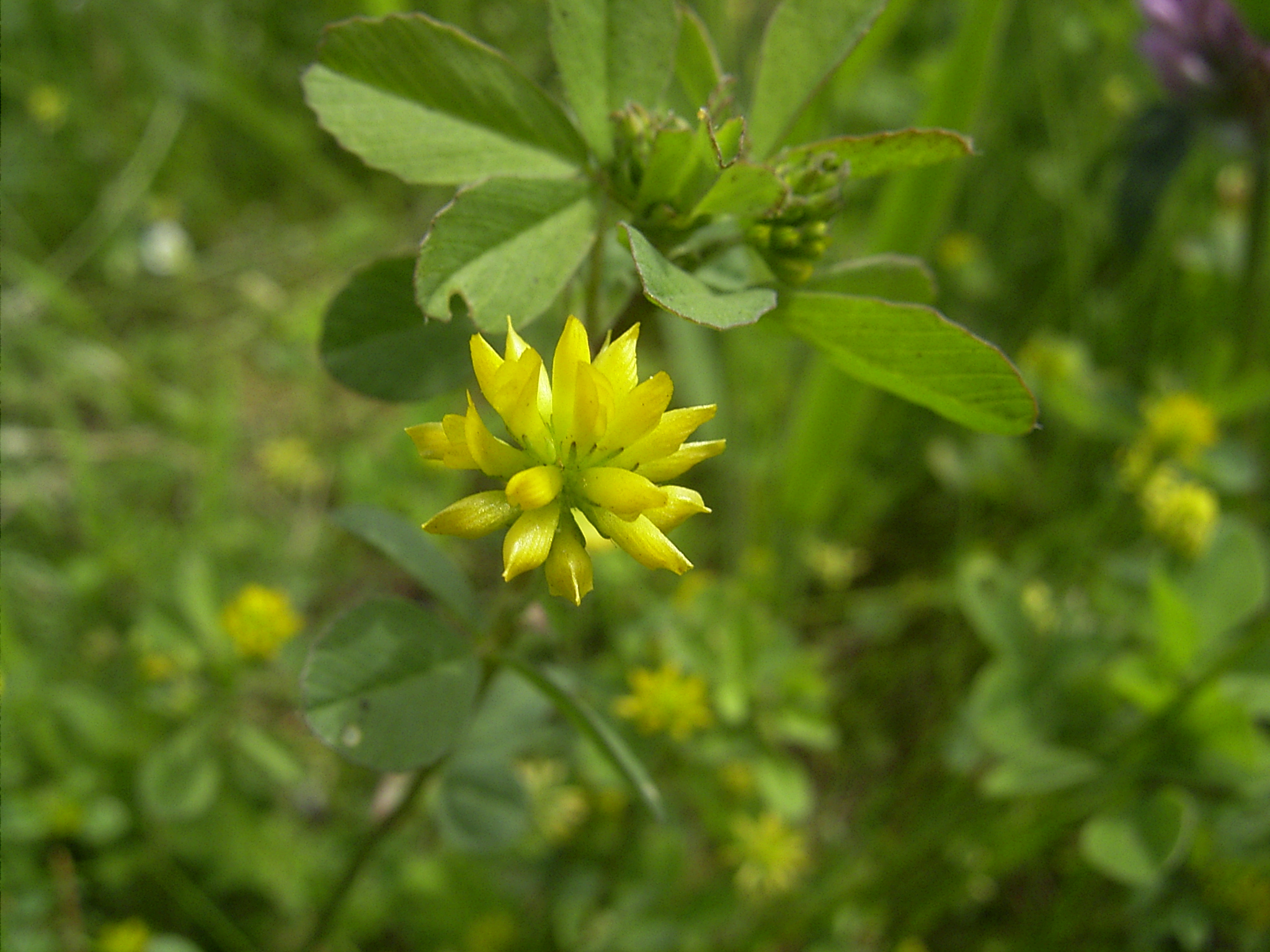

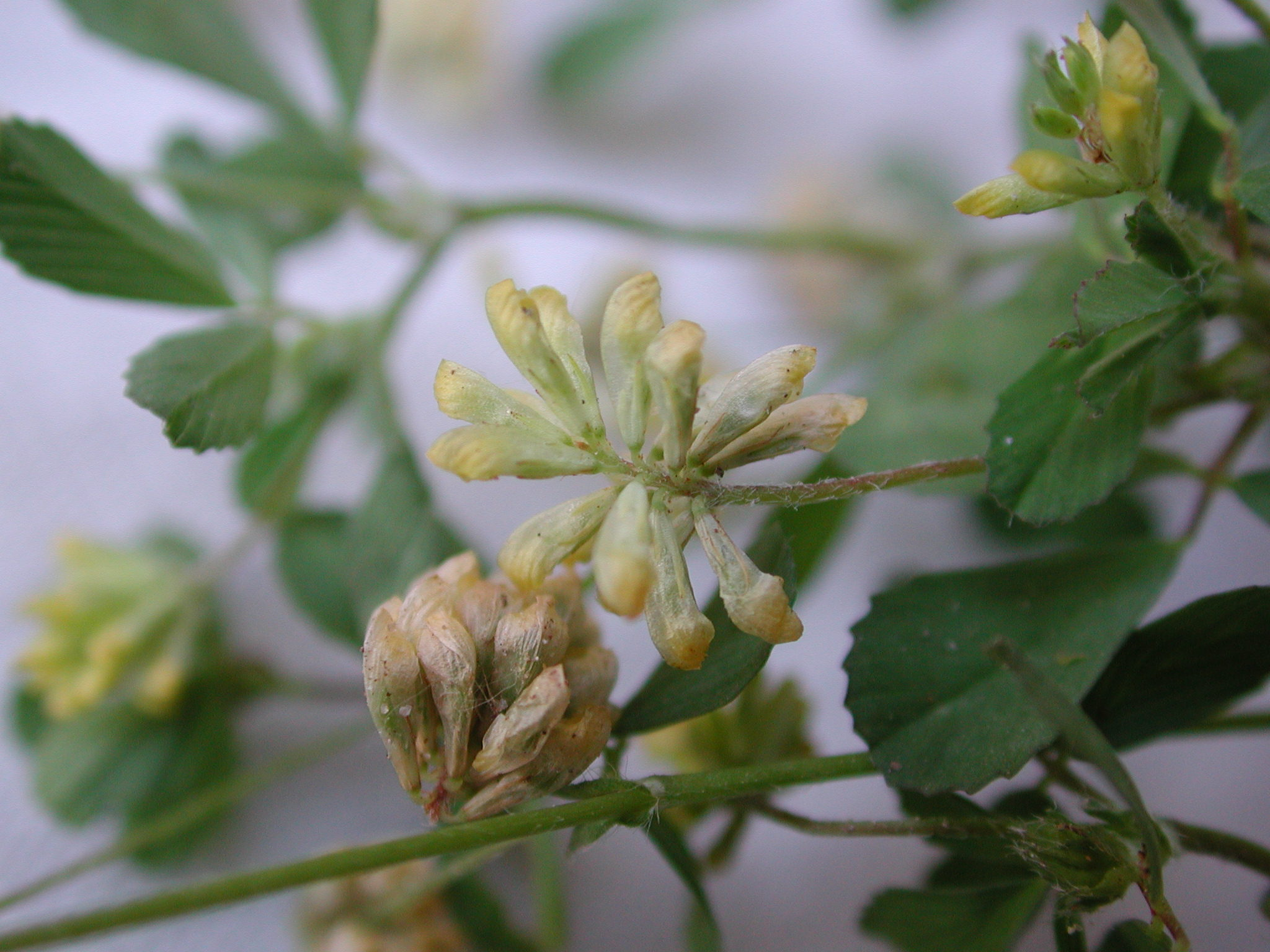

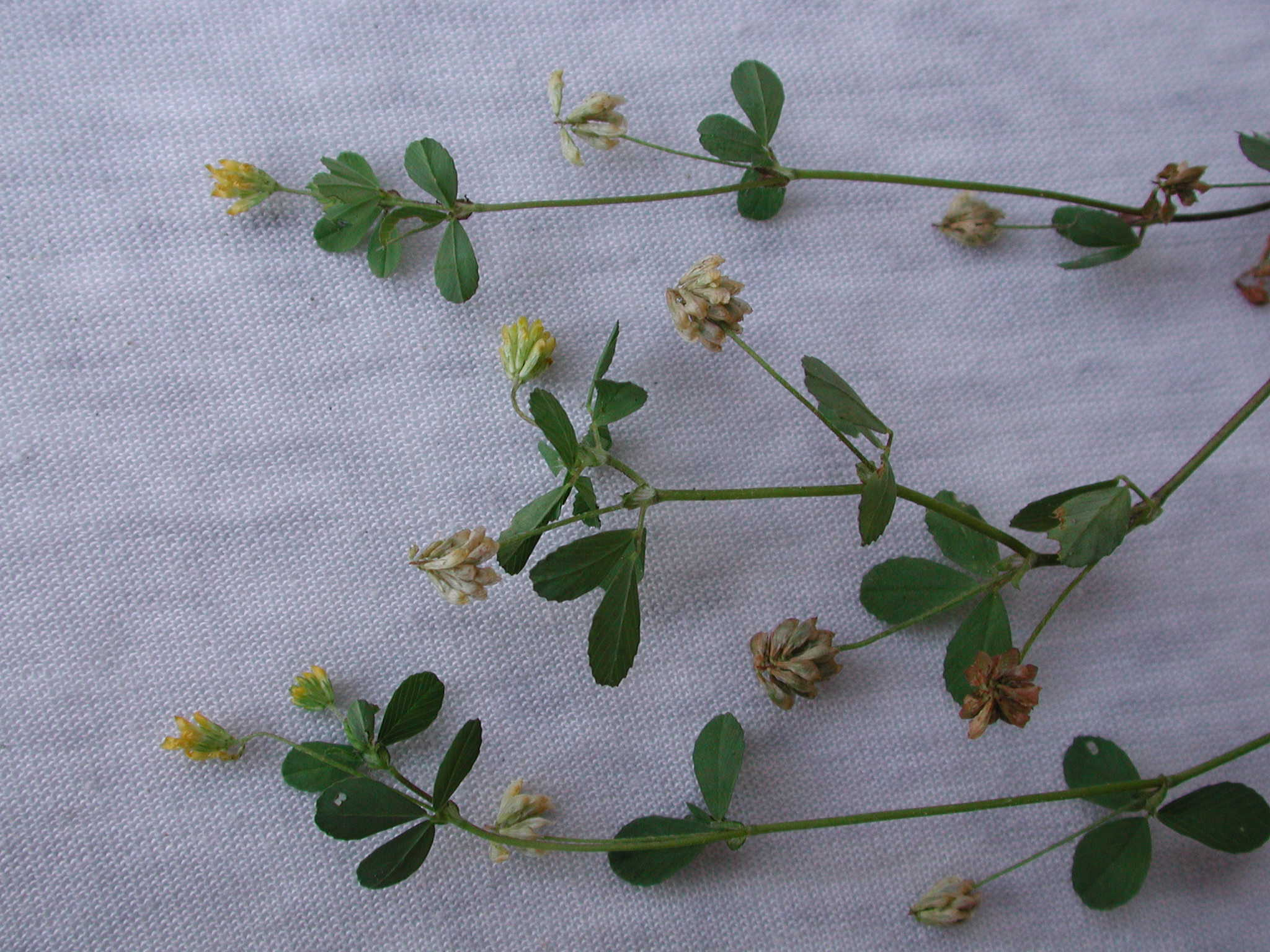

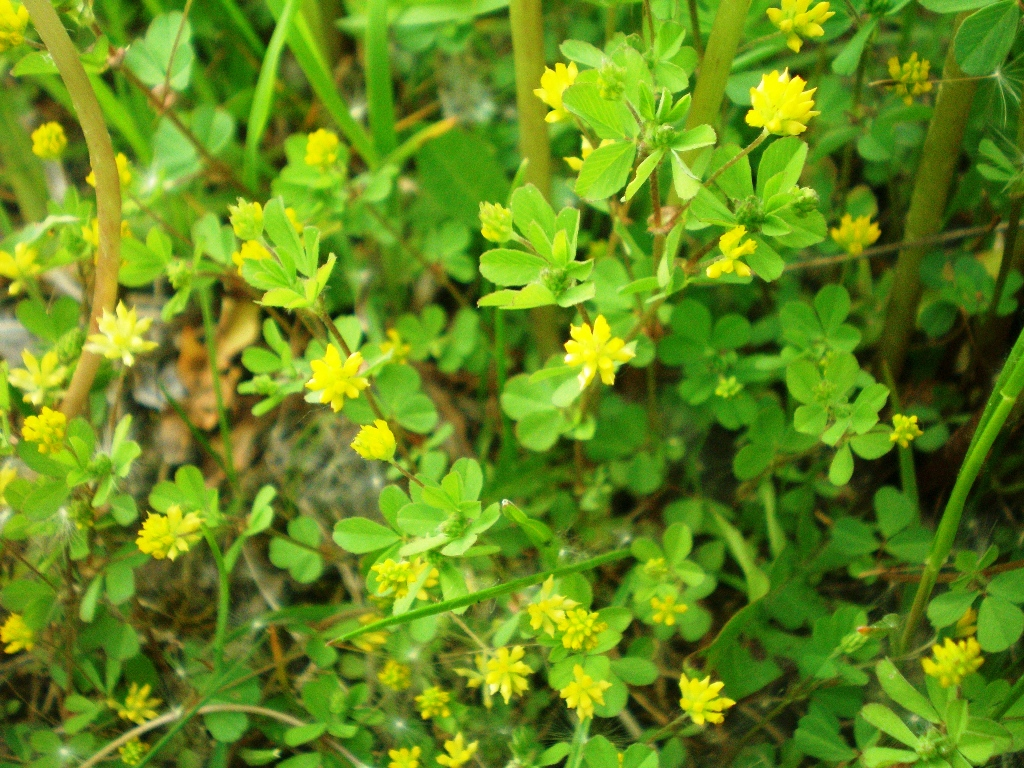

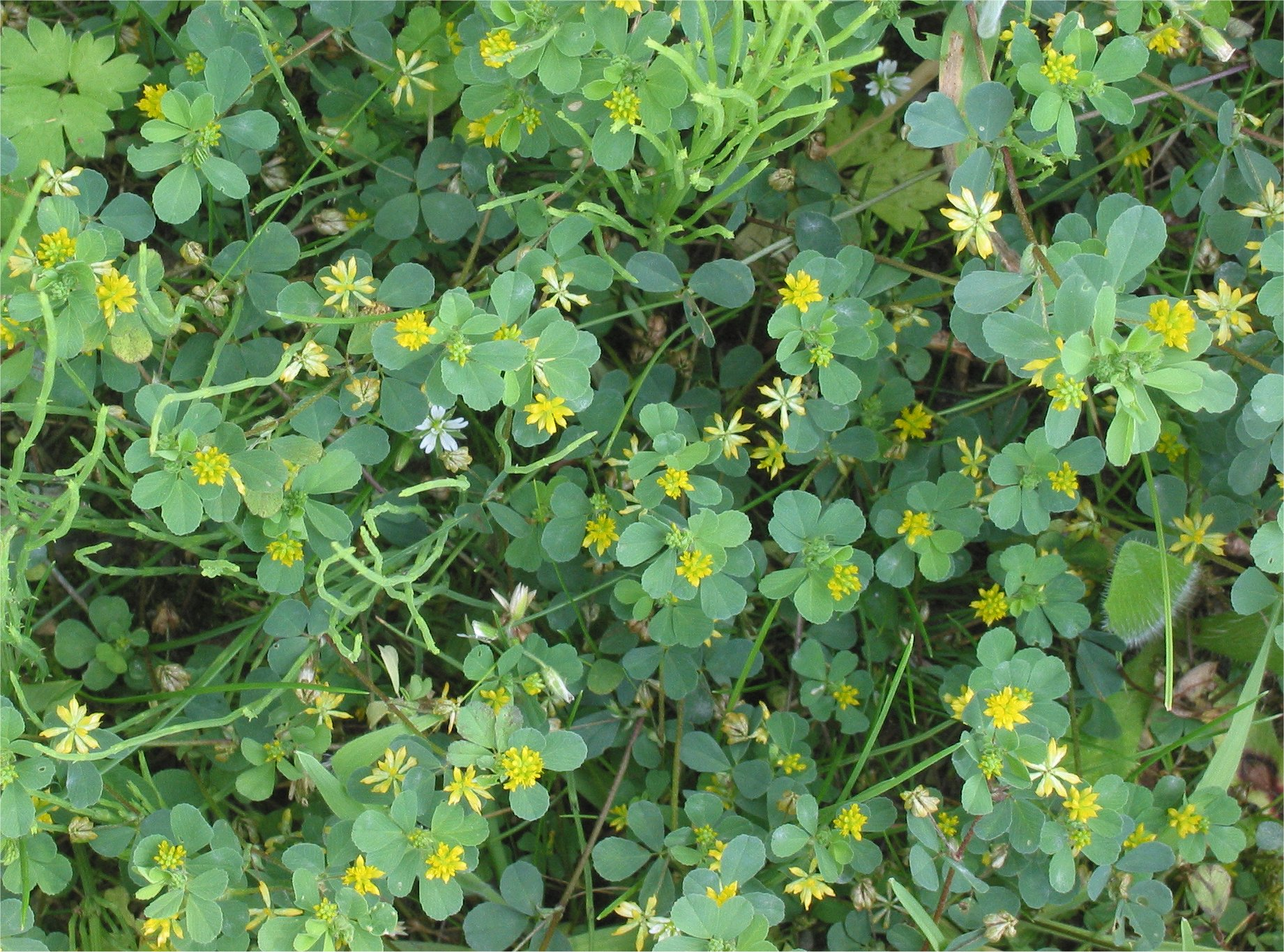

== Similar plants ==
Lesser hop trefoil, Trifolium dubium, may be confused with other plants that have three leaflets and small yellow flowers, such as large hop trefoil (T. aureum), hop trefoil (T. campestre), black medick (Medicago lupulina), and yellow woodsorrel (Oxalis stricta).

== See also ==
- White clover
