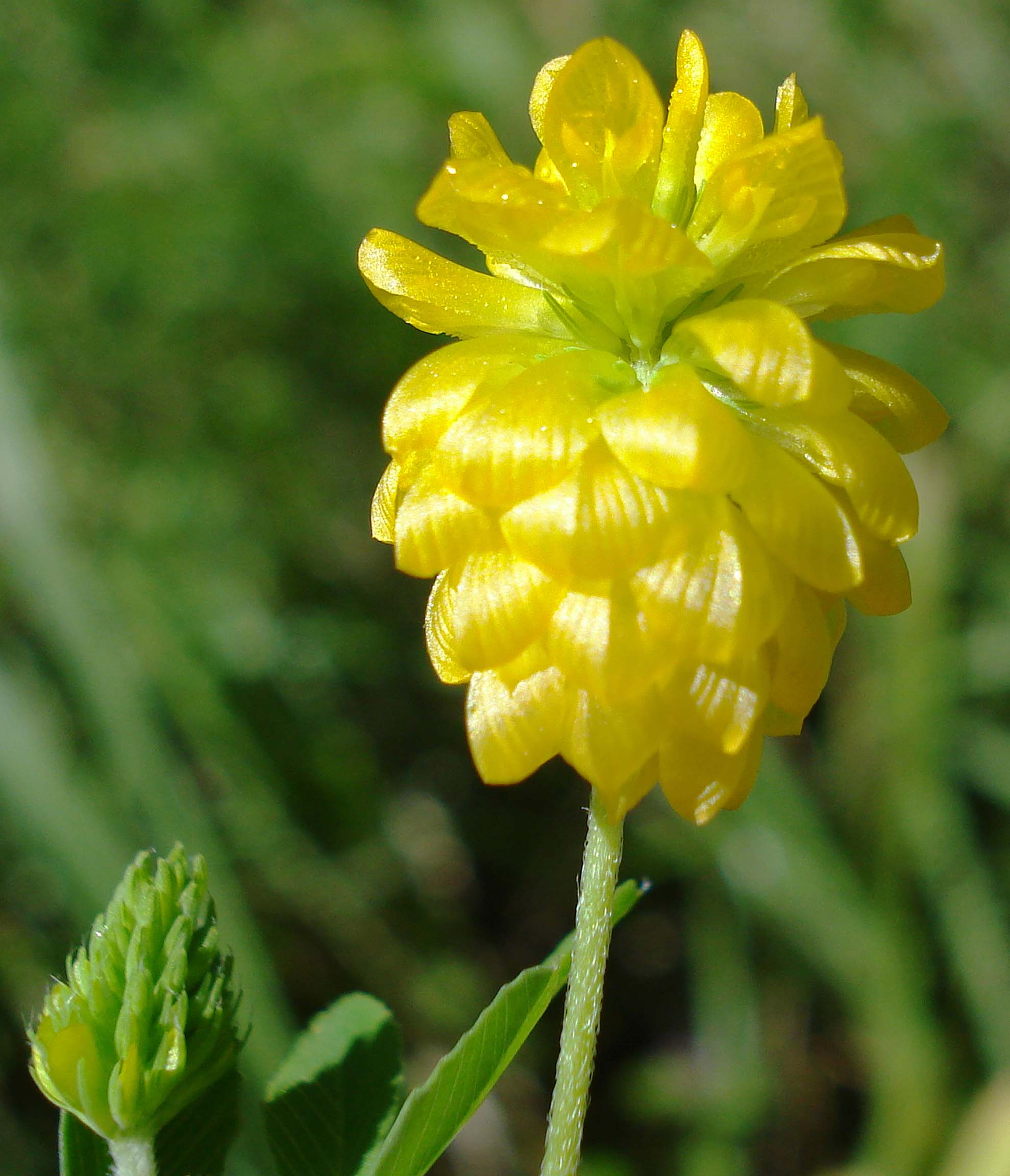

Scientific classification
- Kingdom: Plantae
- Clade: Tracheophytes
- Clade: Angiosperms
- Clade: Eudicots
- Clade: Rosids
- Order: Fabales
- Family: Fabaceae
- Subfamily: Faboideae
- Genus: Trifolium
- Species: T. aureum

Binomial name
- Trifolium aureum Pollich

Synonyms
- Chrysaspis aurea (Pollich) Greene; Trifolium agrarium L.; Trifolium strepens Crantz

= Trifolium aureum =

Species of flowering plant in the bean family

Trifolium aureum, known by the various common names large hop trefoil, large trefoil, large hop clover, golden clover or hop clover, is a species of flowering plant native to much of Eurasia.

== Description ==
Large hop trefoil is a small erect herbaceous biennial plant growing to 10–30 cm (4–12 in) tall. Like all clovers, it has leaves divided into three sessile leaflets, each leaflet 15–25 mm (5/8–1 in) long and 6–9 mm broad.

The yellow flowers are arranged into small, elongated round inflorescences 12–20 mm diameter, located at the end of the stem. Each individual flower is decumbent. As they age, the flowers become brown and paper-like. The fruit is a pod usually containing two seeds.

=== Similar plants ===
Other plants that have three leaflets and small yellow flowers include T. campestre (hop trefoil, which is shorter with smaller foliage), T. dubium (lesser hop trefoil), Medicago lupulina, and Oxalis stricta.

== Distribution and habitat ==
Trifolium aureum is native throughout Europe (in Spain only in the northeast), western and northern Asia, and the Middle East (in Ciscaucasia and western Siberia, Armenia, Azerbaijan, Georgia, northern Iran, Lebanon and Turkey). It is also native to the Canary Islands.

Trifolium aureum is widely naturalized in North America: it was first introduced to the United States (by way of Pennsylvania) in 1800, where it is now found in the western (as far north as Alaska) and eastern regions of the country, but not in the middle, or very much in the southern states. It is also now found in Canada in all of its southerly provinces (with a possible exception being Manitoba).

The plant is very common, and grows well on poor, undisturbed grounds. While it probably has good nutritive values, perennial species are favored as forage.
