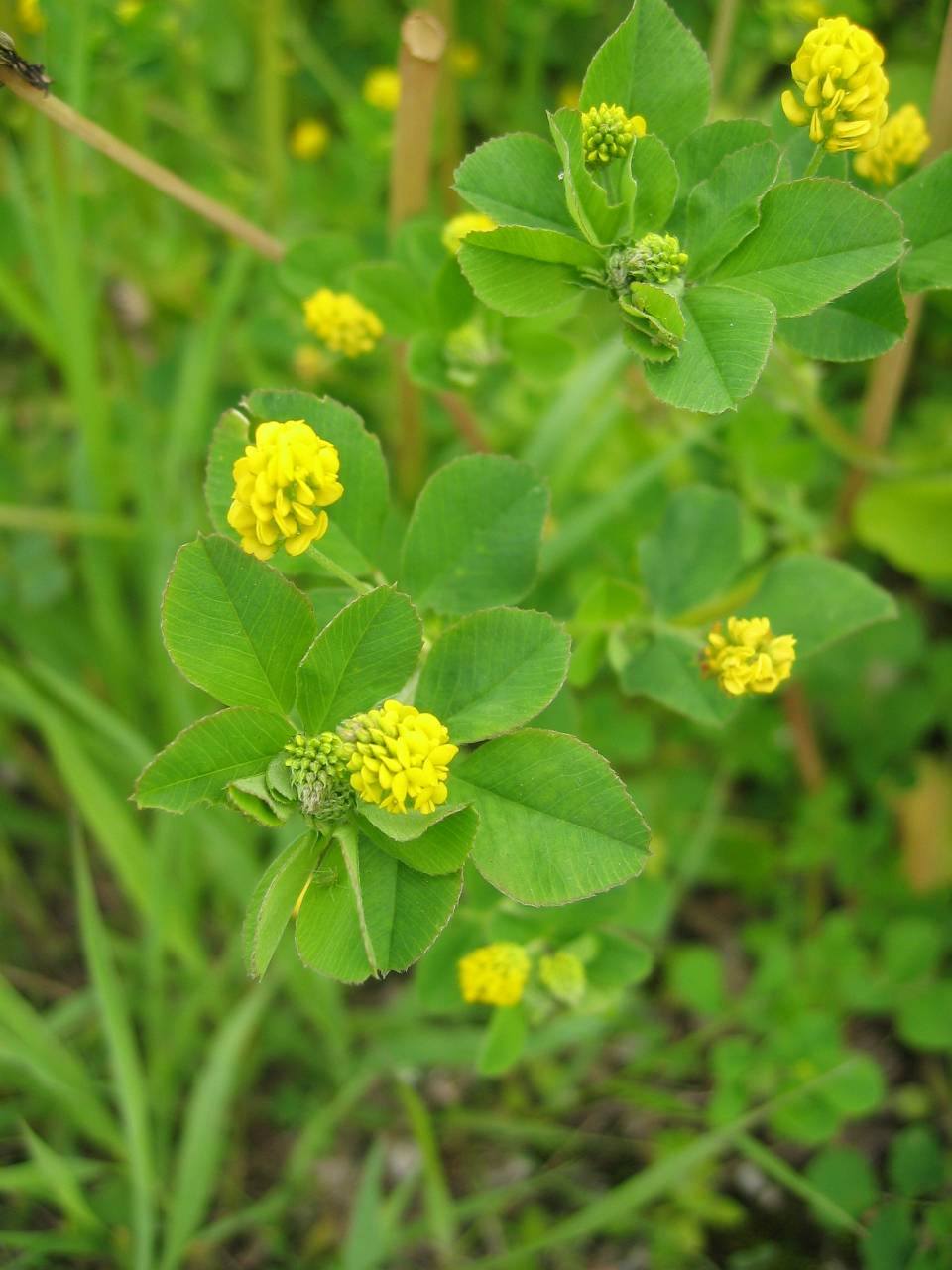

Scientific classification
- Kingdom: Plantae
- Clade: Embryophytes
- Clade: Tracheophytes
- Clade: Angiosperms
- Clade: Eudicots
- Clade: Rosids
- Order: Fabales
- Family: Fabaceae
- Subfamily: Faboideae
- Genus: Medicago
- Species: M. lupulina

Binomial name
- Medicago lupulina L.

Synonyms
- List: Lupularia parviflora Opiz (1852); Lupulina aurata Noulet (1837); Medica lupulina (L.) Scop. (1771); Medicago apennina J.Woods (1850); Medicago breviflora Gilib. (1782); Medicago canescens Menyh. (1877); Medicago ciliaris Lucé (1823); Medicago corymbifera W.L.E.Schmidt ex Schltdl. (1829); Medicago cupianiana Guss. (1844); Medicago mniocarpa Wallr. ex Ser. (1825); Medicago reniformis Dulac (1867); Medicago revoilii H.J.Coste & Soulié (1921); Medicago rigidula var. eriocarpa Rouy (1899); Medicago stipularis Wallr. (1840); Medicago willdenowii Mérat (1812); Medicago willdenowii var. retorta Mérat (1812); Medicula lupulina (L.) Medik. (1787); Medicula lupulina subsp. jalasii (Rothm.) Holub (1983); Medicula lupulina subsp. willdenowiana (W.D.J.Koch) Holub (1983); Melilotus lupulinus (L.) Trautv. (1841); Melilotus medicaginoides Zumagl. (1864); Trifolium lupulinum (L.) Savi (1798); Trigonella mniocarpa Wallr. ex DC. (1825)

= Medicago lupulina =

Plant species in the bean family

Medicago lupulina, commonly known as black medick, nonesuch, or hop clover, is a plant of dry grassland belonging to Fabaceae, the legume or clover family. It is native to Africa and Eurasia, and has been naturalized elsewhere.

== Names ==
The generic name Medicago is derived, via Latin medica, from Ancient Greek Μηδική (Mēdikḗ) "Median", because alfalfa (in the same genus). was believed to have been introduced from the region of Media (now in Iran) in antiquity. The specific name lupulina means "wolf-like", and refers to the hop, or willow-wolf. Its scientific name is a translation of the common name hop clover (or hop-clover), which is also used for several members of the genus Trifolium.

Also spelled "medic" or "meddick", the plant is known by a number of alternate names, including nonesuch, black nonesuch, black medic clover, hop clover, hop medic, black clover, black hay, blackweed, English trefoil, hop trefoil, and yellow trefoil. Some of these names are also applied to wildflowers of the related genera Trifolium and Melilotus.

== Description ==
Medicago lupulina is an annual or short-lived perennial plant, growing each year from adventitious buds on the roots. Mature plants measure from 15 to 80 centimetres (6 to 31 in) in height, with fine stems often lying flat at the beginning of growth and later erecting. The leaves are compound, each with three oval leaflets, carried on a short petiole; the center leaflet usually has a longer petiole. The leaflets are hairy, toothed toward the tip, and differ from those of the similar Trifolium dubium in that they end in a short point.

The species has small (2–3 millimetre) yellow flowers grouped in tight bunches (compact racemes). On larger plants the flower heads may reach 8 mm (5/16 in) or more. The fruit is a single-seeded pod, 1.5 to 3 mm in diameter, that does not open upon maturation, but hardens and turns black when ripe. Each pod contains a single amber-colored seed.

Like other legumes, the roots contain nodules hosting nitrogen-fixing bacteria. Plants that survive for more than one year may develop a deep tap root.

=== Similar species ===
Medicago plants are closely related to the true clovers (Trifolium) and sweet clover (Melilotus). Like the true clovers, M. lupulina has three leaflets and a small, yellow flower closely resembling those of T. dubium (lesser hop trefoil). Other examples include T. campestre (hop trefoil), T. aureum (large hop trefoil), and Oxalis stricta (yellow woodsorrel).

== Distribution and habitat ==
A native of the Old World, the species is found throughout Europe, north Africa, the Near East, and most of Asia, including India, China, and Korea. It is naturalized in central Asia, Japan, South Africa, Australia, New Zealand, the United States, Canada, and much of South America. It is found throughout the US, including Hawaii and Alaska.

The plant thrives in dry to moist, well-drained soils containing sand, loam, or clay, and is a pioneer plant, often growing on disturbed ground. It grows in alkaline, neutral, and mildly acidic conditions. It does not grow in shady areas. It grows well in limestone soils and on coastal sand dunes, where it suffers less competition from the other plants, and as such is found on many islands, such as Taiwan, the Canary Islands, the Azores, and Madeira. It is resistant to cold and can be found on mountains up to 1,800 metres (5,900 ft) above sea level.

== Uses ==
Black medick is a good source of nectar for bees to use to make honey. It may be planted in order to create artificial meadows, especially on dry land. The presence of the species in large concentrations as a lawn weed may indicate that the soil is poor in nitrogen. However, because it and other clovers fix nitrogen in the soil, this deficiency can improve over time due to the presence of these plants.

The species is sometimes used as a fodder plant. Its hardiness and ability to grow in poor soils, as well as its tendency to fix nitrogen in the soil, make it a good choice for pasturage, although its fodder value is limited. It is grazed by sheep but is not very palatable to cattle.

=== Photographs ===
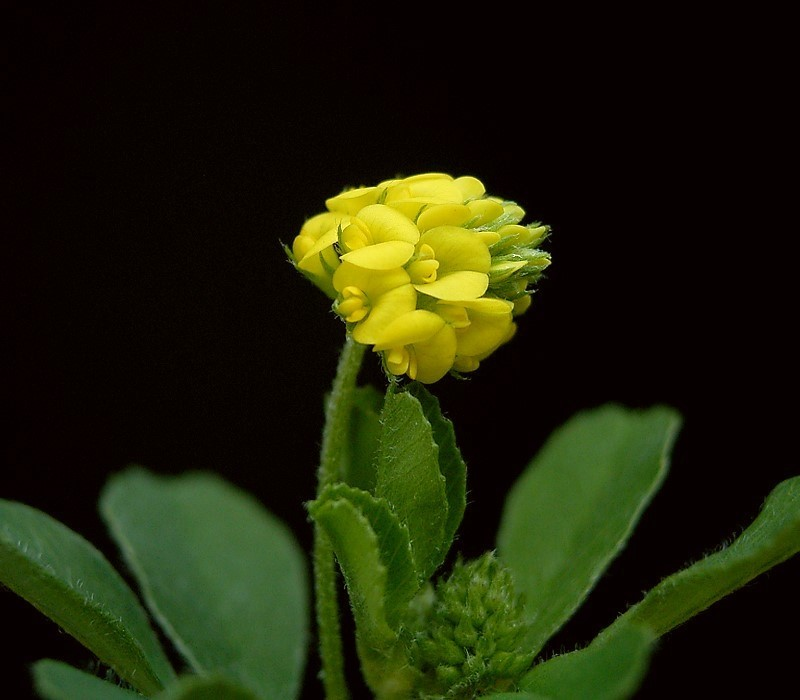
Flower

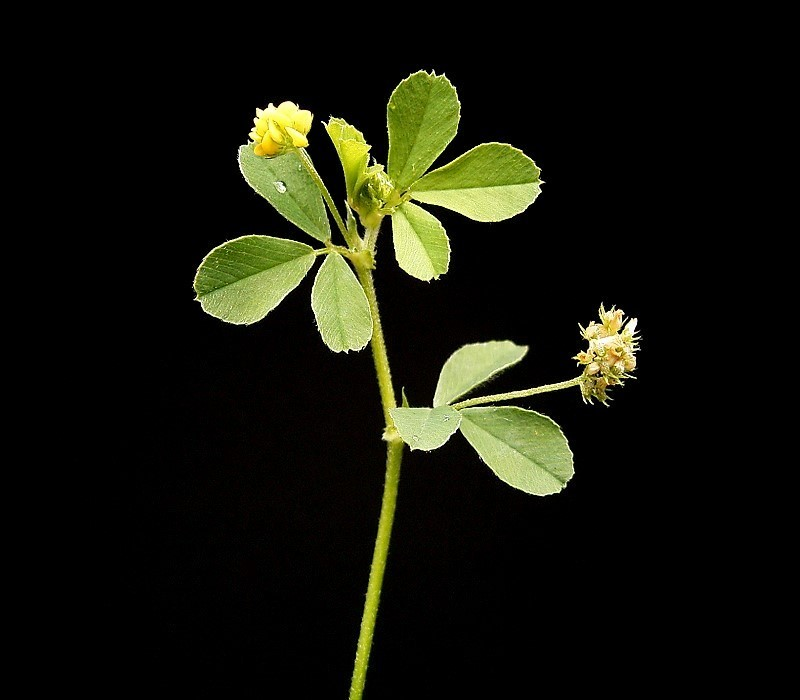
Leaves and flowers

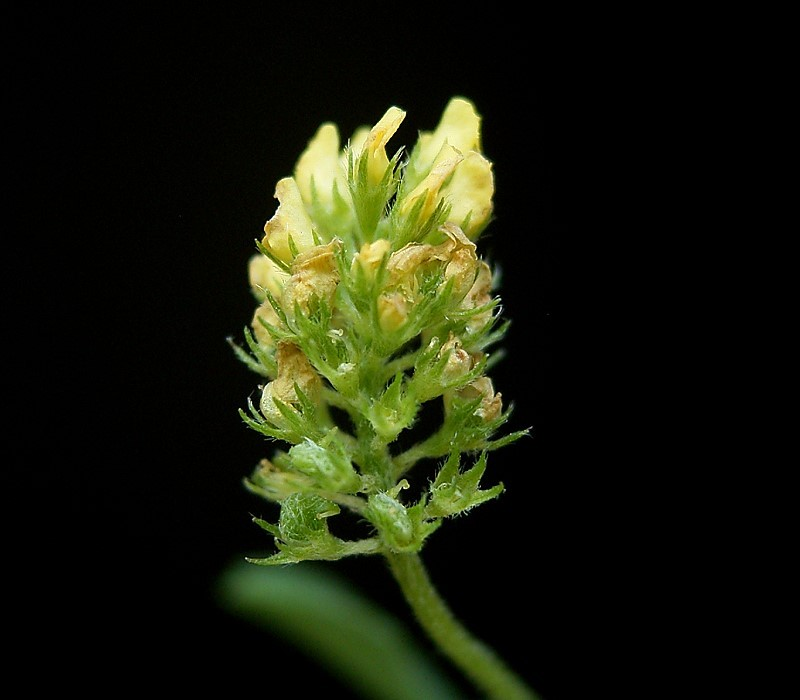
Flowers wilting after pollination

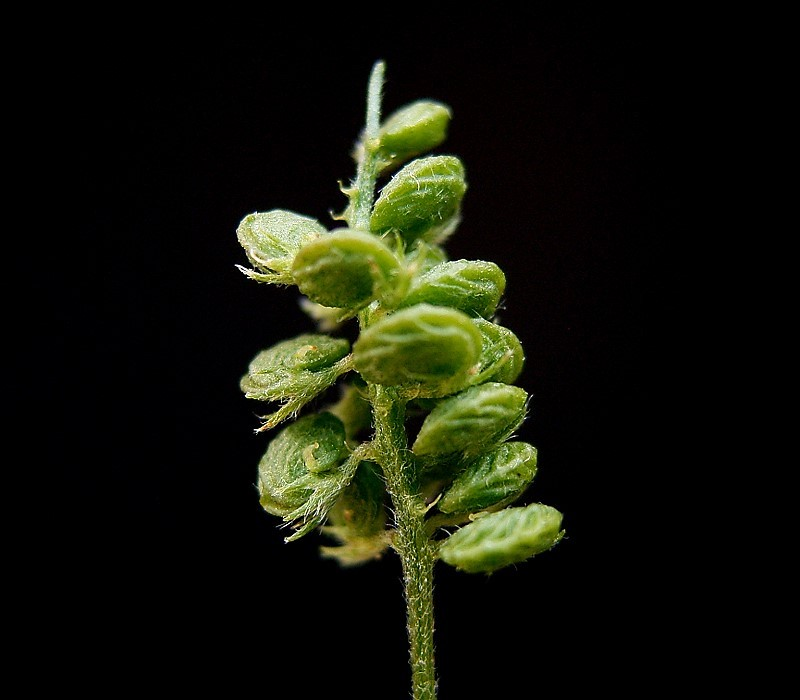
unripe seed pods (green)

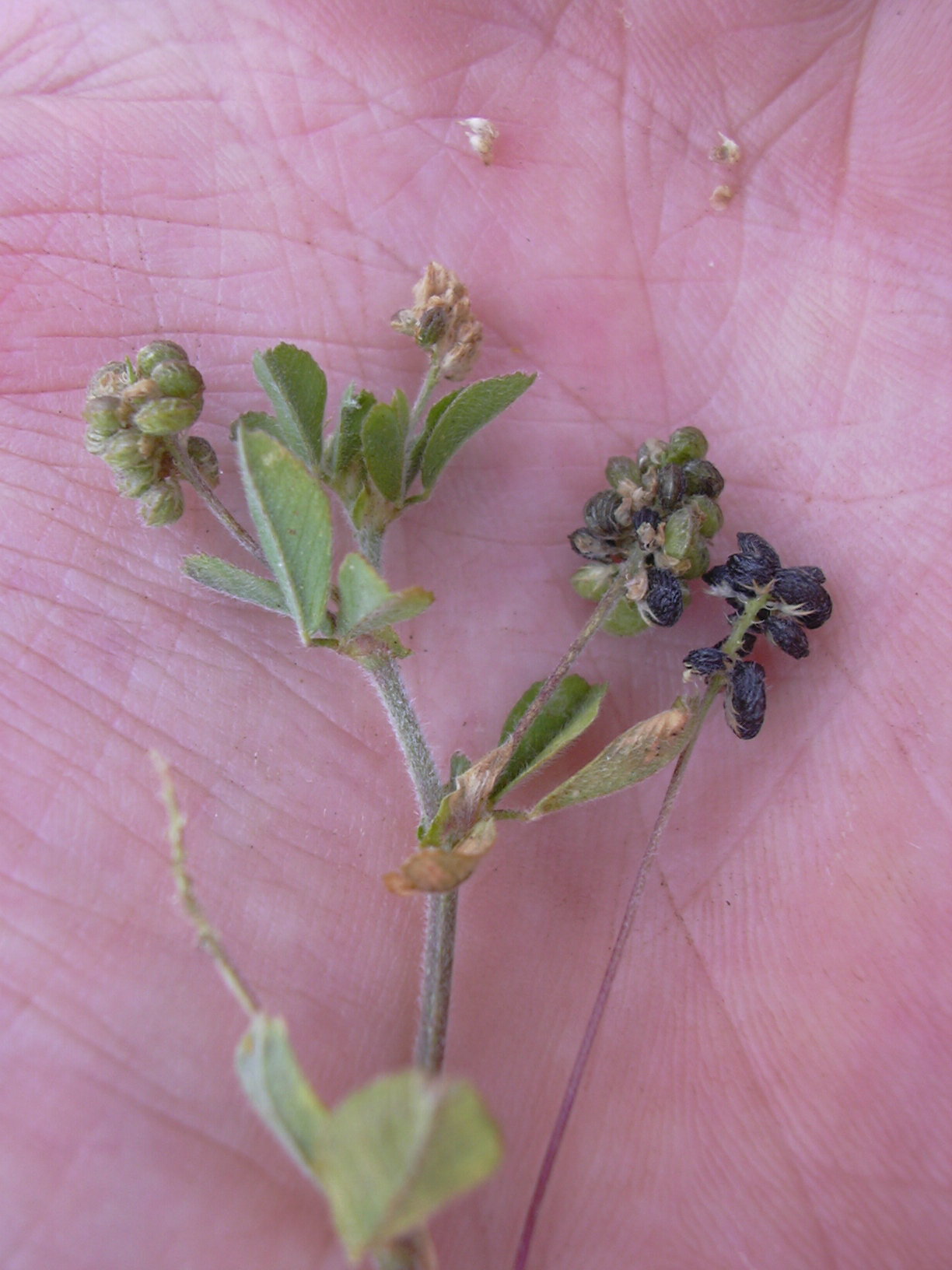
ripe seed pods (black)

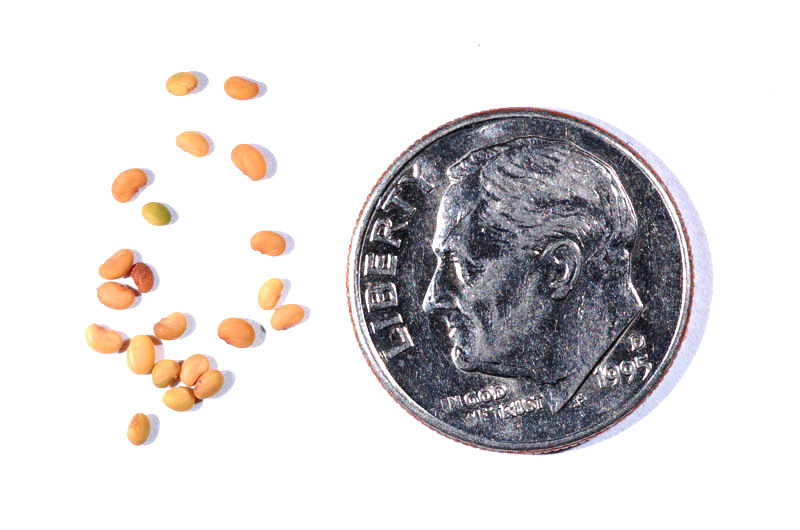
seeds next to US dime for scale

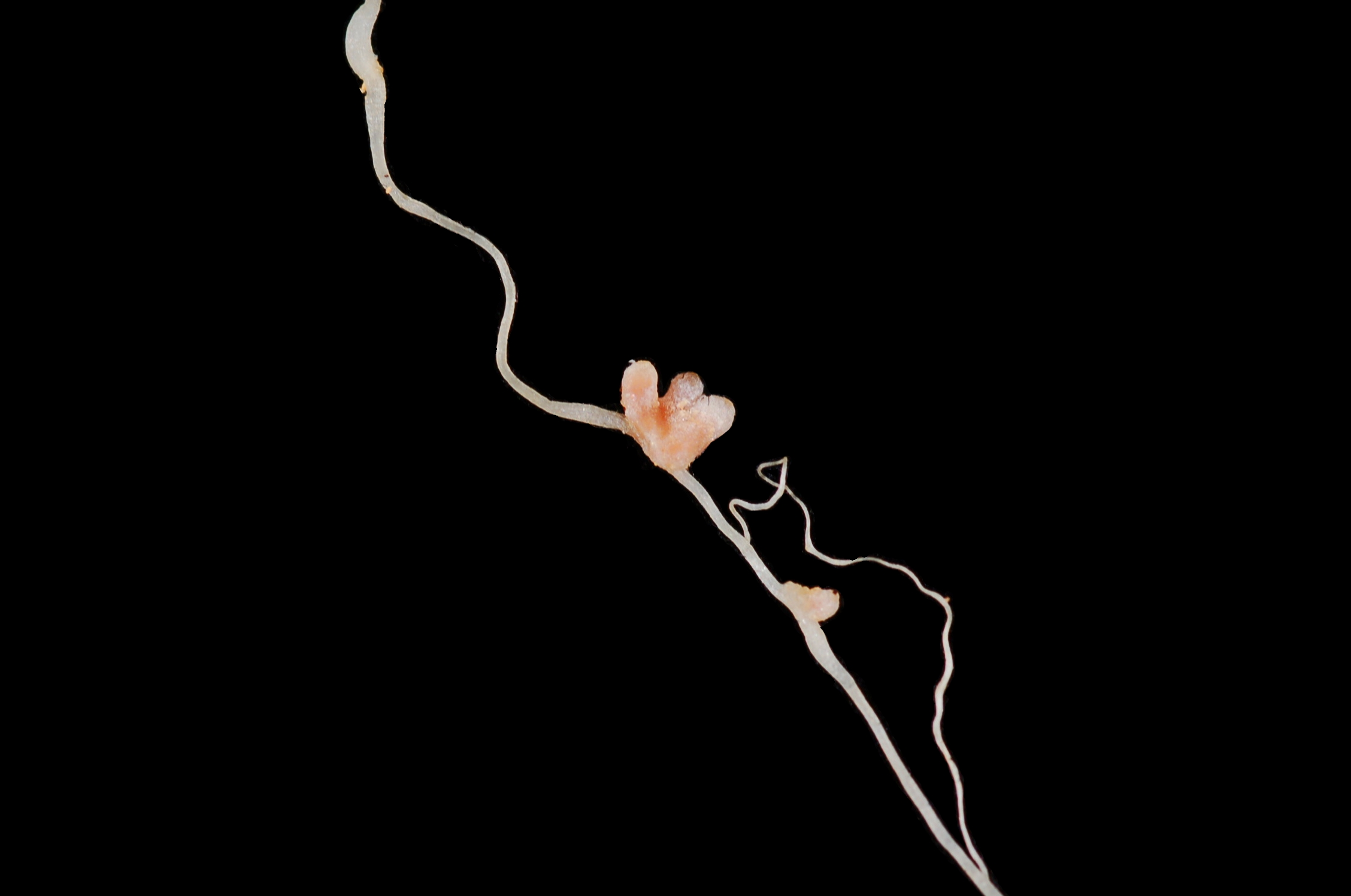
Root with nodules

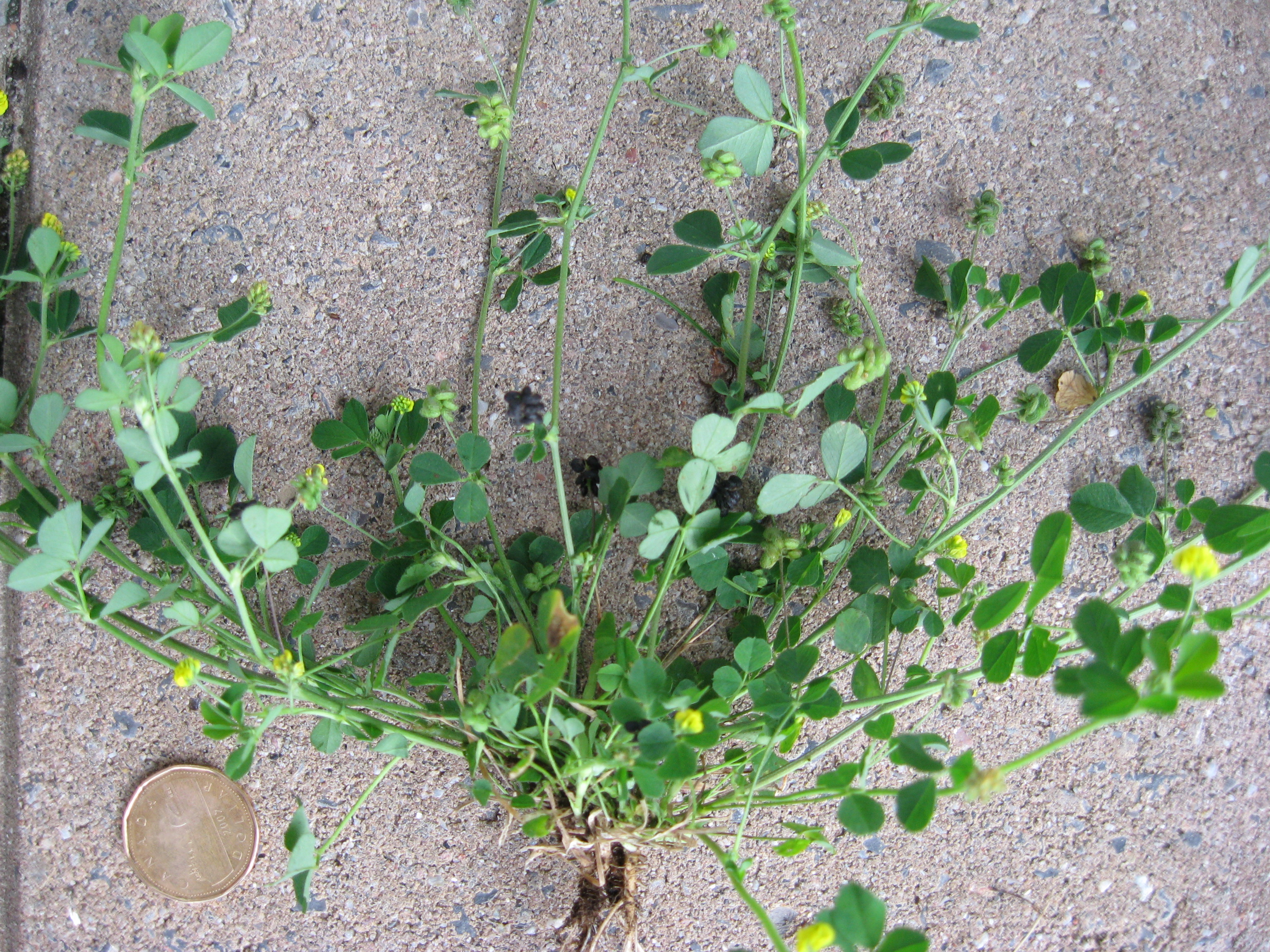
an entire uprooted plant

=== Illustrations ===
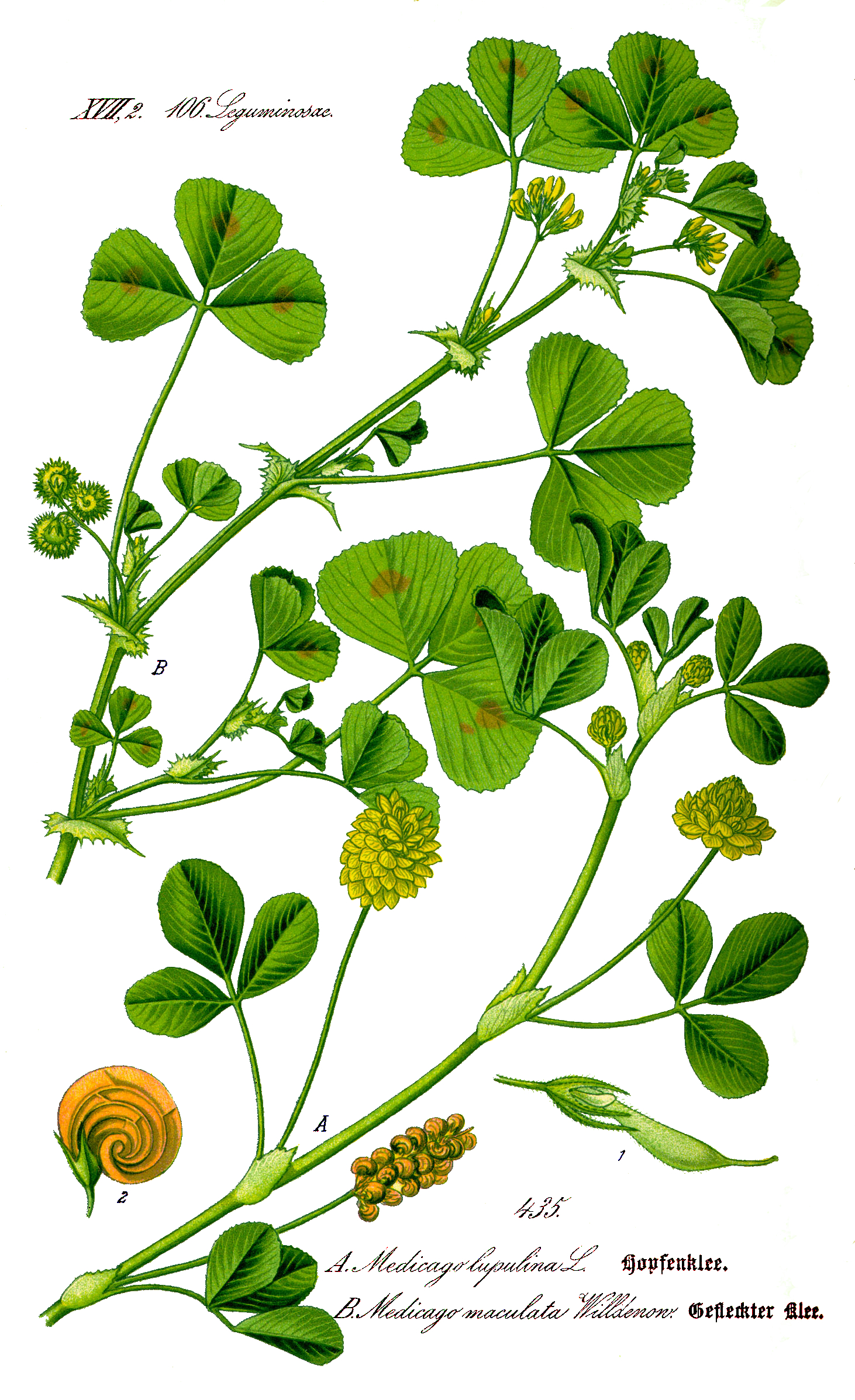
Color plate: M. arabica top; M. lupulina bottom.

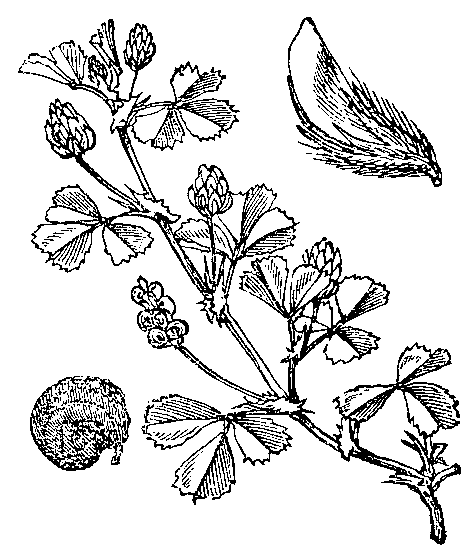

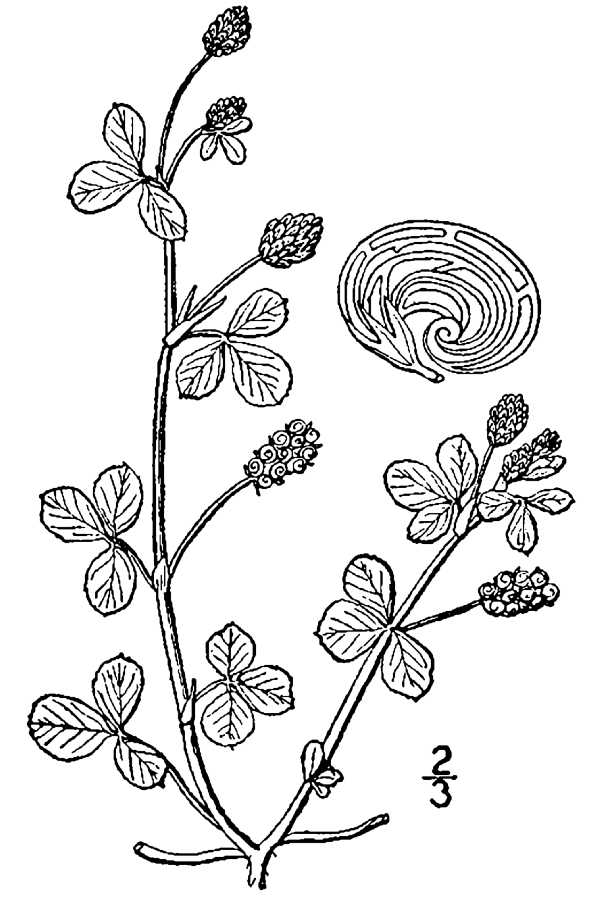

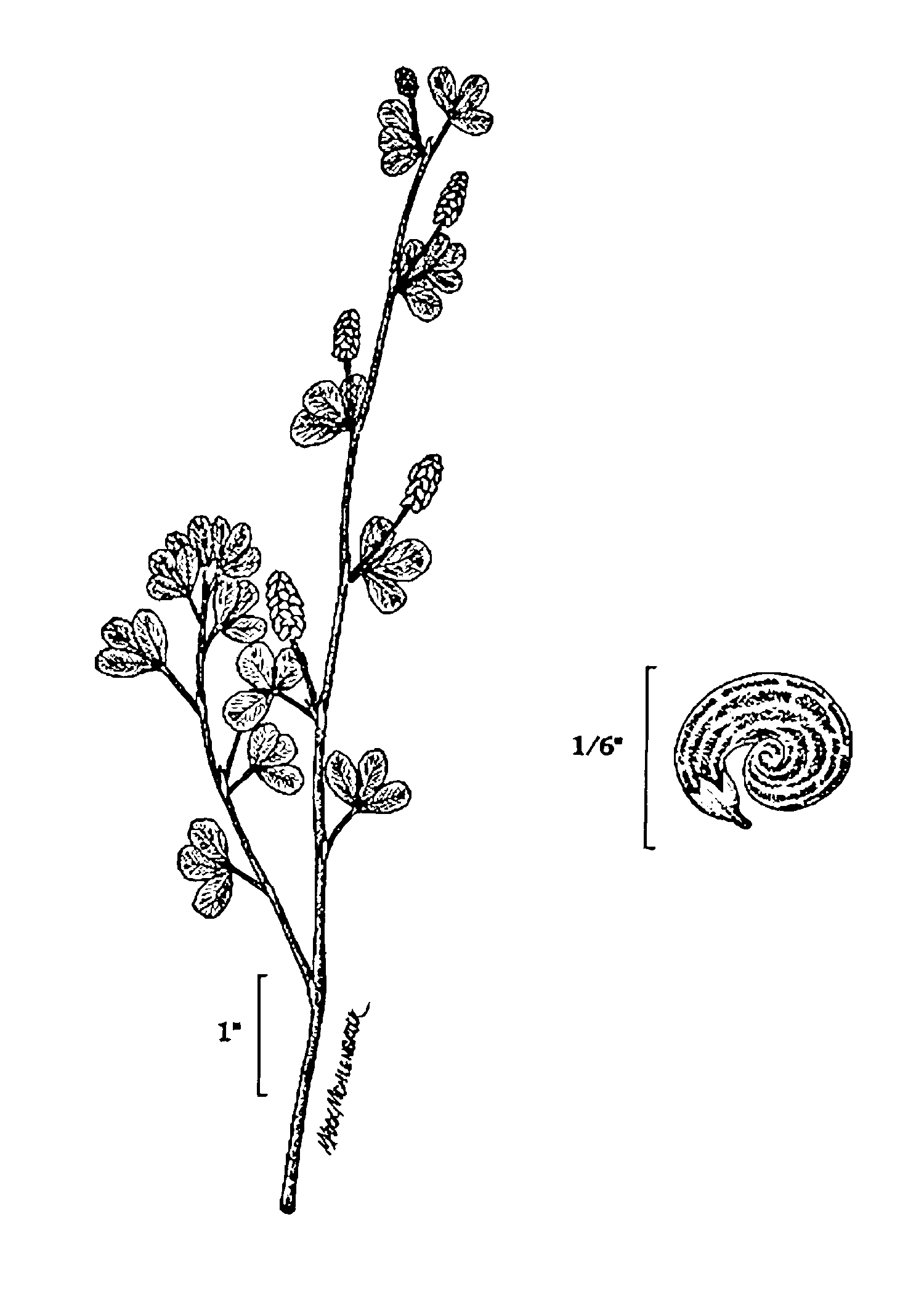
