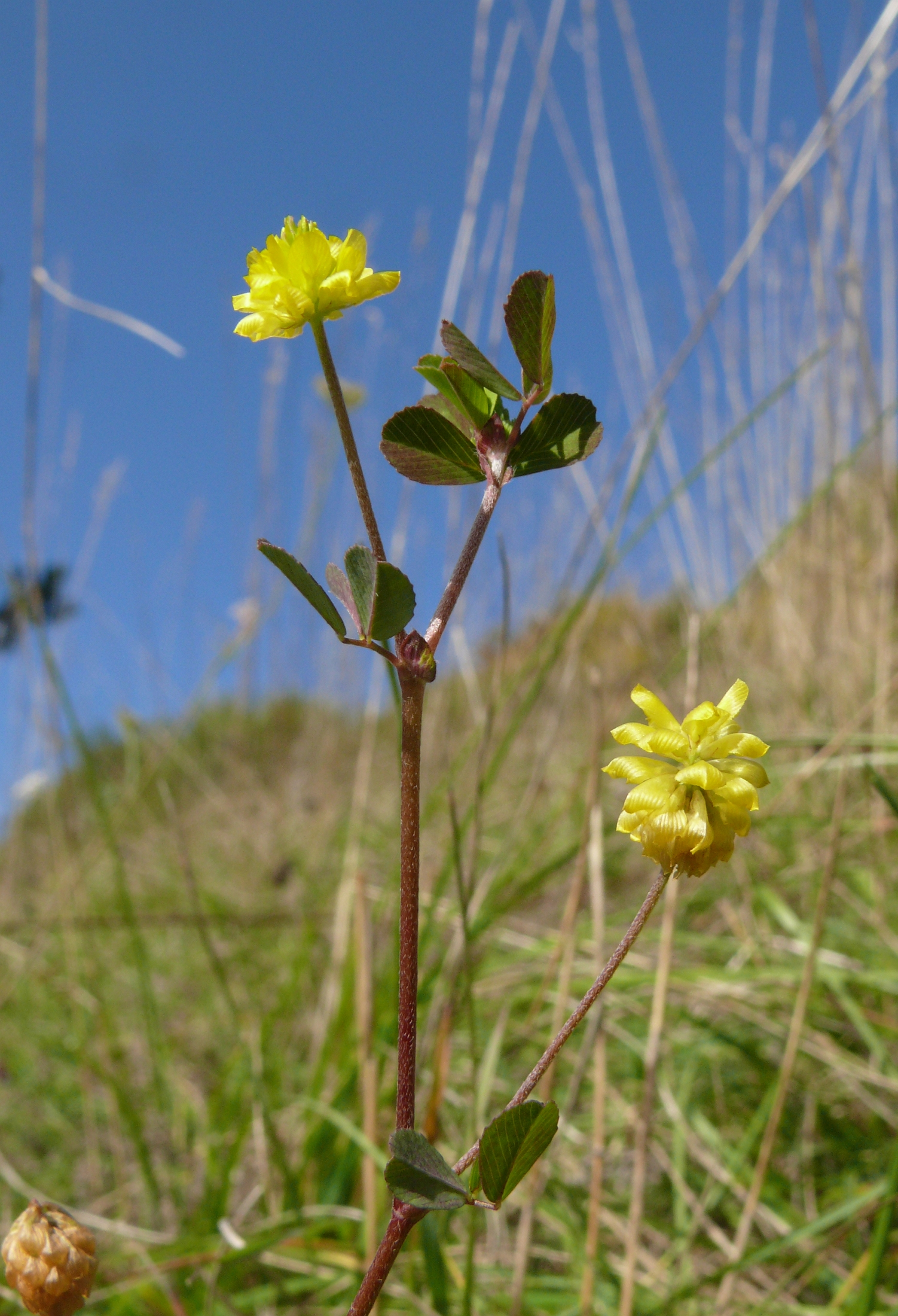

Scientific classification
- Kingdom: Plantae
- Clade: Tracheophytes
- Clade: Angiosperms
- Clade: Eudicots
- Clade: Rosids
- Order: Fabales
- Family: Fabaceae
- Subfamily: Faboideae
- Genus: Trifolium
- Species: T. campestre

Binomial name
- Trifolium campestre Schreb.

= Trifolium campestre =

Hop Trefoil

Species of flowering plant in the bean family

Trifolium campestre, commonly known as hop trefoil, field clover and low hop clover, is a species of flowering plant native to Europe, North Africa, Macaronesia and western Asia.

== Description ==
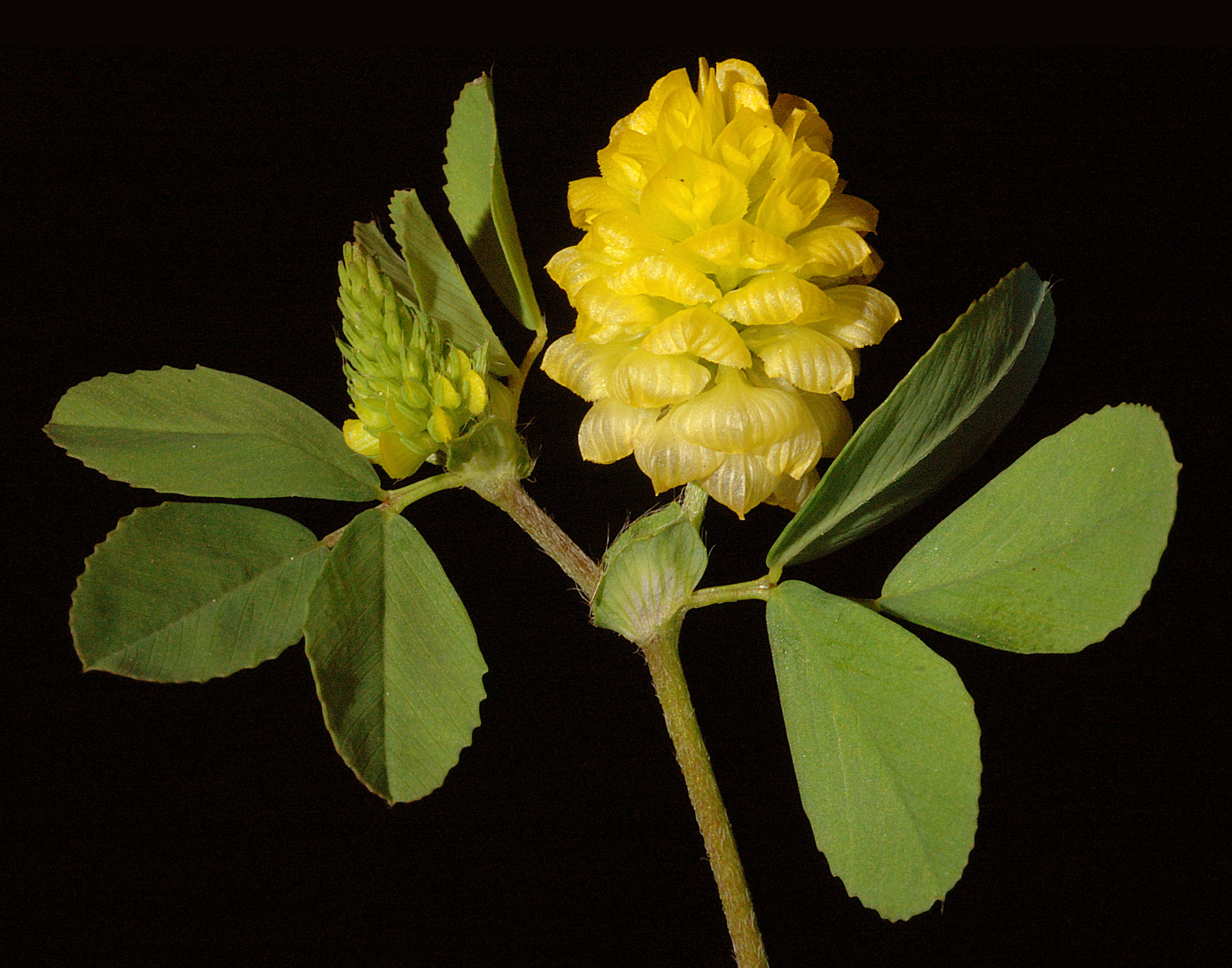
Leaves and flower

It is a herbaceous annual plant, growing to 10–30 centimetres (4–12 in) tall. The leaves are alternate and trifoliate, with three oblong or elliptical leaflets 4–10 millimetres (1/4–1/2 in) long.

The distinctive yellow flowerheads superficially resemble hop flowers. Each flowerhead is a cylindrical or spherical collection of 20–40 individual flowers. The flowers turn brown with age and drying, enclosing the fruit, a single-seeded pod.

=== Similar plants ===
The species may be confused with others that have three leaflets and small yellow flowers, such as T. aureum (large hop trefoil), T. dubium (lesser hop trefoil), Medicago lupulina (black medick), and Oxalis stricta (yellow woodsorrel).

== Etymology ==
The species name campestre means "of the fields".

== Distribution and habitat ==
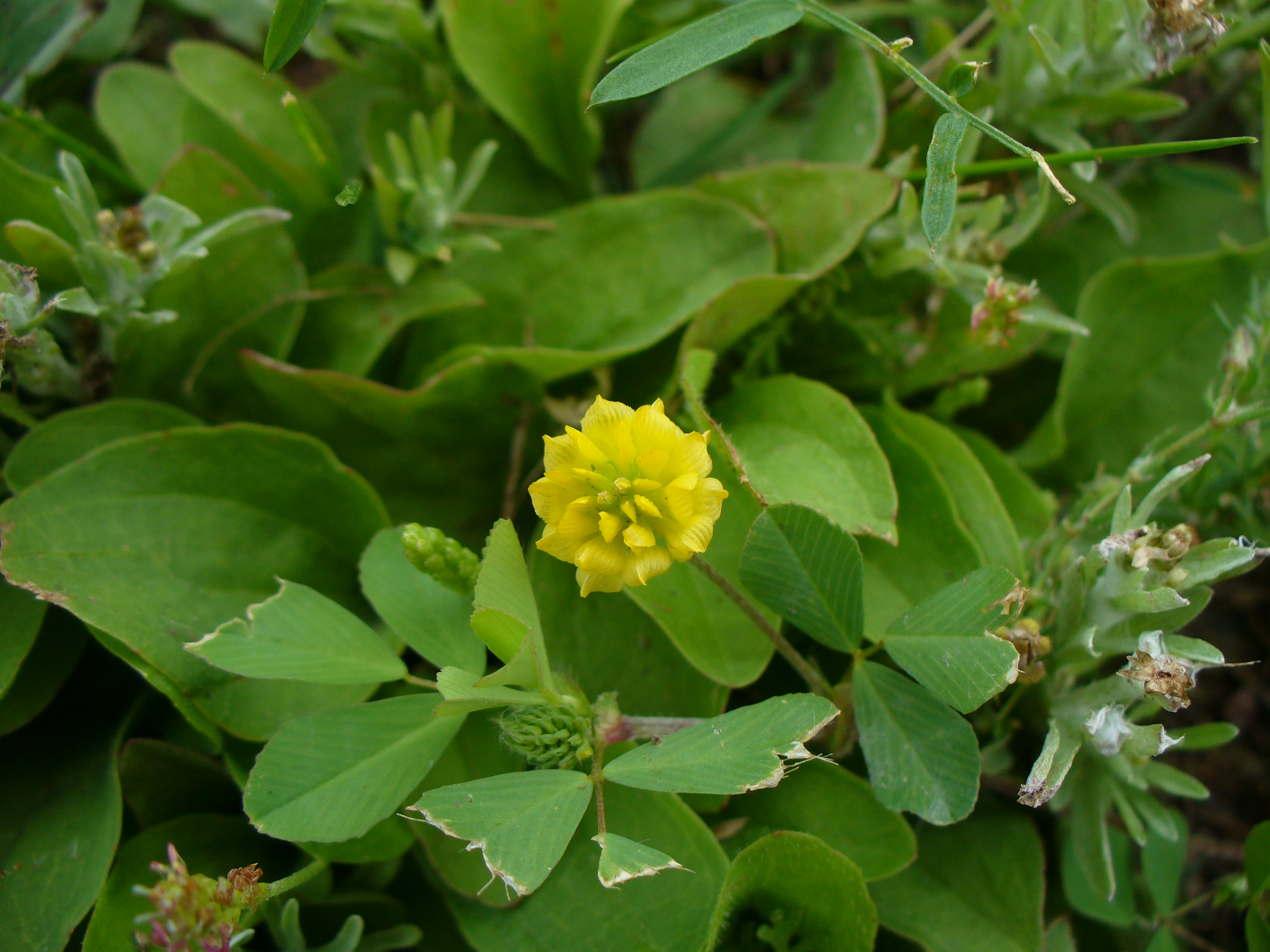
Newfoundland

It is native to Europe and western Asia, growing in dry, sandy grassland habitats, fields, woodland margins, roadsides, wastelands and cultivated land.

It has become naturalised in North America, particularly in the west and south of the continent.

== Uses ==
Hop trefoil is an important clover in agriculture because its foliage is good for feeding livestock and replenishing soil. It is not generally planted, but is considered a valuable herb when found growing in a pasture.
