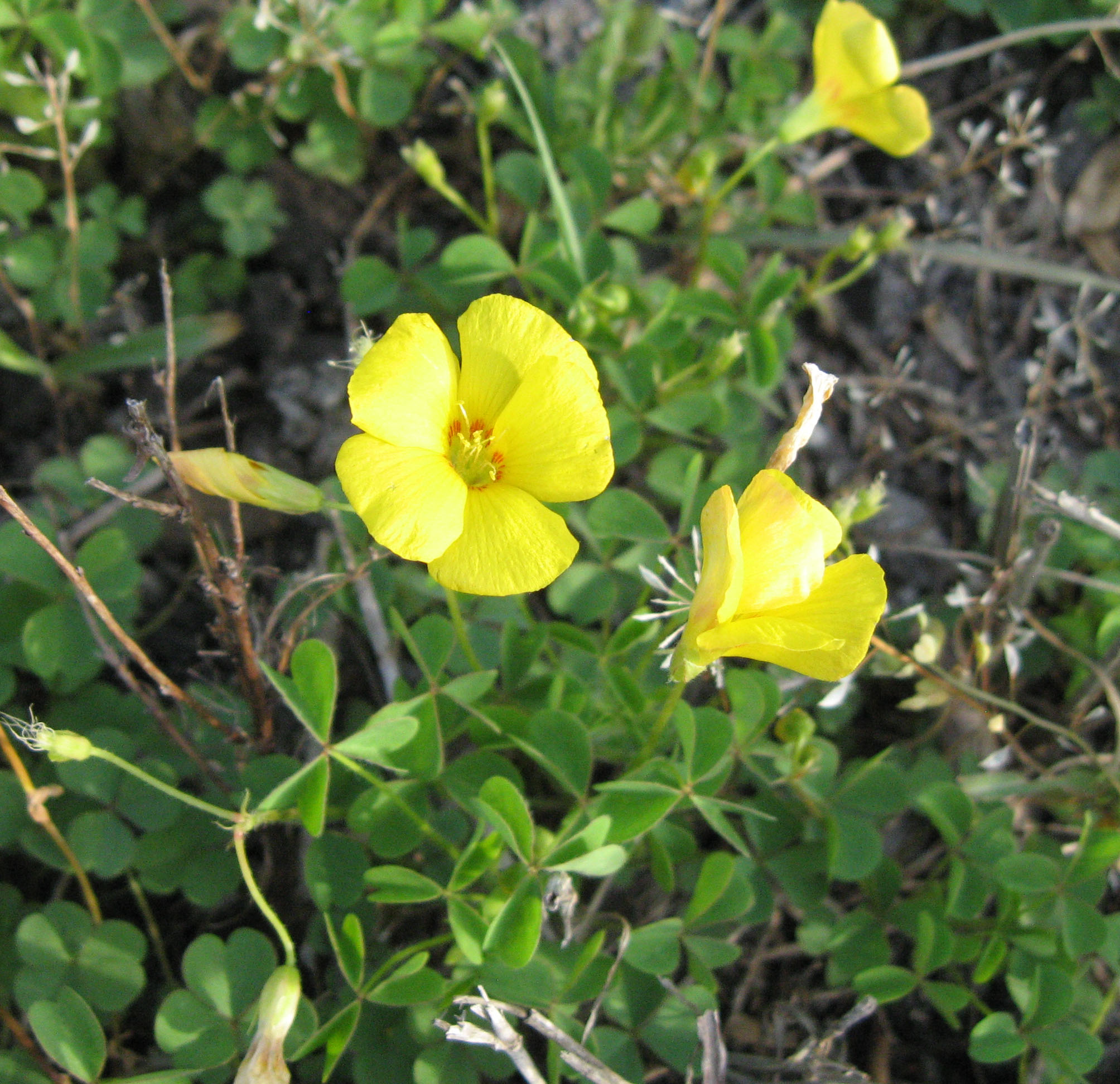

Scientific classification
- Kingdom: Plantae
- Clade: Tracheophytes
- Clade: Angiosperms
- Clade: Eudicots
- Clade: Rosids
- Order: Oxalidales
- Family: Oxalidaceae
- Genus: Oxalis
- Species: O. priceae

Binomial name
- Oxalis priceae Small

Synonyms
- Oxalis macrantha (Trelease) Small

= Oxalis priceae =

Species of flowering plant

Oxalis priceae, the tufted yellow woodsorrel, is a species of flowering plant in the woodsorrel family. It is native primarily to southeastern North America, with a disjunct population being known from montane areas of Nuevo León, Mexico. This species is found in dry, rocky, calcareous areas such as cedar glades and cliff faces, but it is occasionally found in oak-pine woodlands and longleaf pine savanna as well.

Oxalis priceae is a highly rhizomatous perennial herb that flowers in the spring. It is distinguished from other Oxalis by its combination of large, strongly red-lines petals, densely villous stems, and rhizomatous habit.

Two closely related species, Oxalis texana and Oxalis florida, were once considered varieties of this species.
