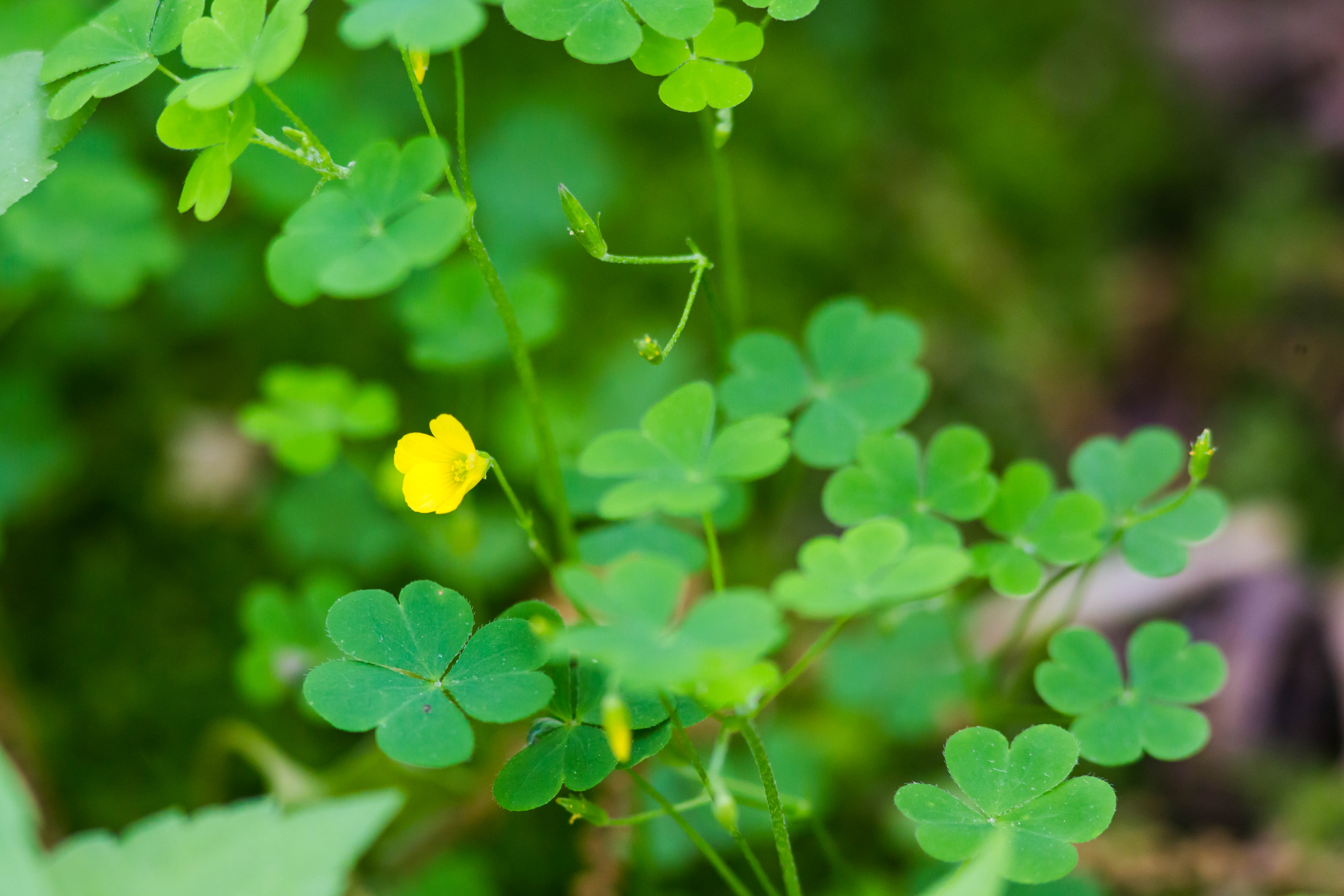

Conservation status
- Secure (NatureServe)

Scientific classification
- Kingdom: Plantae
- Clade: Embryophytes
- Clade: Tracheophytes
- Clade: Angiosperms
- Clade: Eudicots
- Clade: Rosids
- Order: Oxalidales
- Family: Oxalidaceae
- Genus: Oxalis
- Species: O. dillenii

Binomial name
- Oxalis dillenii Jacq.

Synonyms
- Oxalis corniculata var. dillenii; Xanthoxalis dillenii

= Oxalis dillenii =

Species of flowering plant

Oxalis dillenii, the southern wood-sorrel, slender yellow woodsorrel, or Dillen's oxalis, is a species in the woodsorrel family. Like other Oxalis species, the leaves of this plant resemble clover leaves, with three leaflets. Oxalis dillenii can be confused with other small yellow flowered species in North America, such as Oxalis stricta and Oxalis florida. The flowers have five yellow petals that are 4 to 10 mm (0.16 to 0.39 in) in length. The leaflets are 1 to 2 cm (0.39 to 0.79 in) wide with pointed hairs. The fruits are rather brown and are 1.5 to 2.5 cm (0.59 to 0.98 in). It is often considered a weed, and can be found worldwide, but likely originated in North America.

== Taxonomy ==
Oxalis dillenii was given its scientific name by Nikolaus Joseph von Jacquin in 1794. It is part of the genus Oxalis within the family Oxalidaceae and it has 15 synonyms.

Table of Synonyms
Name	Year	Rank	Notes
Oxalis arborea T.Moore & Mast.	1881	species	= het.
Oxalis boreaui P.Fourn.	1937	species	= het., nom. superfl.
Oxalis corniculata f. diffusa (Boreau) Fiori	1901	form	= het.
Oxalis corniculata proles diffusa (Boreau) Rouy	1897	proles	= het.
Oxalis corniculata var. dillenii (Jacq.) Trel.	1897	variety	≡ hom.
Oxalis corniculata var. lyonii (Pursh) Zucc.	1831	variety	= het.
Oxalis diffusa Boreau	1857	species	= het.
Oxalis dillenii var. radicans Shinners	1956	variety	≡ hom.
Oxalis florida subsp. prostrata (Haw.) Lourteig	1979	subspecies	= het.
Oxalis lyonii Pursh	1813	species	= het.
Oxalis prostrata Haw.	1803	species	= het.
Oxalis recurva var. floridana Wiegand	1925	variety	= het.
Oxalis sanguinolaria Raf.	1817	species	= het.
Xanthoxalis dillenii (Jacq.) Holub	1972	species	≡ hom.
Xanthoxalis lyonii (Pursh) Holub	1973	species	≡ hom.
Notes: ≡ homotypic synonym ; = heterotypic synonym

== Ecology ==
Oxalis dillenii is insect pollinated and is recorded to have been visited in northern Florida by Augochloropsis metallica, Bombus impatiens, Ceratina, Lasioglossum creberrimum, Lasioglossum pectorale, Lasioglossum tegulare/puteulanum, Lasioglossum vierecki,and Lasioglossum weemsi/leviense.
