= Trifolium micranthum =

Scientific classification
- Kingdom: Plantae
- Clade: Tracheophytes
- Clade: Angiosperms
- Clade: Eudicots
- Clade: Rosids
- Order: Fabales
- Family: Fabaceae
- Subfamily: Faboideae
- Genus: Trifolium
- Species: T. micranthum

Binomial name
- Trifolium micranthum Viv.

Synonyms
- Chrysaspis micrantha (Viv.) Hendrych; Trifolium filiforme L.

Species of legume

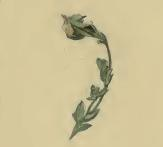
A sprig of Trifolium micranthum

Trifolium micranthum, the slender trefoil or slender hop clover, is a plant species of the genus Trifolium in the "pea family"; Fabaceae or Papillionaceae.

It is distributed in Central and Western Europe on river dunes. It is an annual species with ovate or lance shaped leaves, the middle leaves with shorter petioles.

The stems of the flowering head hang over slightly. The heads have 5-7 bright yellowish orange flowers which appear from May until July.

The pods are turned in one direction.
