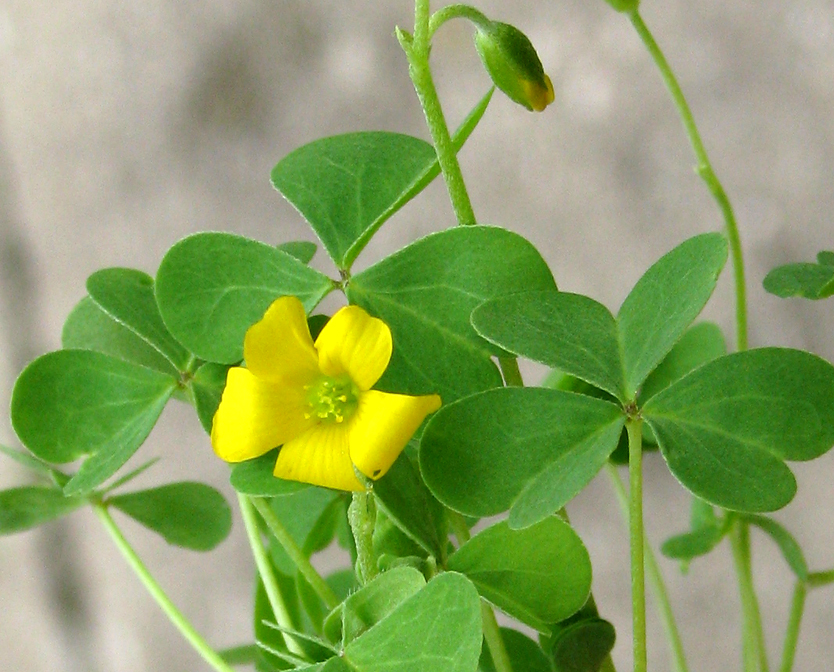

Conservation status
- Secure (NatureServe)

Scientific classification
- Kingdom: Plantae
- Clade: Embryophytes
- Clade: Tracheophytes
- Clade: Angiosperms
- Clade: Eudicots
- Clade: Rosids
- Order: Oxalidales
- Family: Oxalidaceae
- Genus: Oxalis
- Species: O. stricta

Binomial name
- Oxalis stricta L.

Synonyms
- Oxalis europaea Jord.; Oxalis fontana Bunge

= Oxalis stricta =

Plant species in the wood-sorrel family

Oxalis stricta, called the common yellow woodsorrel (or simply yellow woodsorrel), common yellow oxalis, or upright yellow-sorrel is a herbaceous plant.

== Habitat ==
O. stricta is native to North America and East Asia and has been introduced elsewhere, especially in Europe. It was not documented in Michigan before the 1890s.

It tends to grow in woodlands, meadows, and in disturbed areas as both a perennial and annual. and generally requires dry or moist, alkaline soils, preferring sandy and loamy dirt to grow in. It requires well-drained soil and can grow in nutritionally poor grounds.

Commonly considered a weed of gardens, fields, and lawns, it grows in full sun or shade.

== Description ==
Upright yellow woodsorrel is an annual or short-lived perennial plant that has short rhizomes, but never has bulbs. The alternate leaves of this plant are divided into three distinctively heart-shaped leaflets (a typical trait of other species of Oxalis) that can grow up to 2 cm (0.79 in) wide. These leaves curl up at night (exhibiting nyctinasty), and open in the day to perform photosynthesis.

The flowers of the plant are hermaphroditic, blooming from July to October.

The mature seed capsules open explosively when disturbed (a very similar trait to that of the mature seed capsules or fruits of plants found in the genus Impatiens) and can disperse seeds up to 4 m (13 ft) away.

Erect when young, this plant later becomes decumbent as it lies down, and branches regularly.

It is not to be confused with similar plants in the same genus which are also often referred to as "yellow woodsorrel".

== Taxonomy ==
Oxalis stricta was given its scientific name in 1753 by Carl Linnaeus. It is classified in the genus Oxalis within the family Oxalidaceae. It has 82 synonyms including 29 species names.

Table of Synonyms
Name	Year	Rank	Notes
Acetosella chinensis (Haw. ex G.Don) Kuntze	1891	species	= het., not validly publ.
Acetosella fontana (Bunge) Kuntze	1891	species	= het.
Acetosella stricta (L.) Kuntze	1891	species	≡ hom.
Ceratoxalis coloradensis (Rydb.) Lunell	1916	species	= het.
Ceratoxalis cymosa (Small) Lunell	1916	species	= het.
Ceratoxalis stricta (L.) Lunell	1916	species	≡ hom.
Oxalis ambigua Salisb.	1794	species	≡ hom., nom. illeg.
Oxalis bushii Small	1898	species	= het.
Oxalis chinensis Haw. ex G.Don	1832	species	= het., nom. nud.
Oxalis coloradensis Rydb.	1902	species	= het.
Oxalis corniculata var. longepedunculata (Sennen) R.Knuth	1930	variety	= het.
Oxalis corniculata subsp. navieri (Jord.) Tourlet	1908	subspecies	= het.
Oxalis corniculata proles navieri (Jord.) Rouy	1897	proles	= het.
Oxalis corniculata subvar. piletocarpa (Wiegand) Farw.	1926	subvariety	= het.
Oxalis corniculata subsp. stricta (L.) Bonnier & Layens	1894	subspecies	≡ hom.
Oxalis corniculata var. stricta (L.) Sav.	1798	variety	≡ hom.
Oxalis corniculata proles stricta (L.) Rouy	1897	proles	≡ hom.
Oxalis cymosa Small	1896	species	= het.
Oxalis dillenii var. piletorum (Wiegand) Priszter	1980	variety	= het.
Oxalis europaea Jord.	1854	species	= het.
Oxalis europaea var. bushii (Small) Wiegand	1925	variety	= het.
Oxalis europaea f. cymosa (Small) Wiegand	1925	form	= het.
Oxalis europaea var. lanulosa Benke	1929	variety	= het.
Oxalis europaea f. pallidiflora Fernald	1942	form	= het.
Oxalis europaea f. pilosella Wiegand	1925	form	= het.
Oxalis europaea f. subglabrata Wiegand	1925	form	= het.
Oxalis europaea f. vestita Wiegand	1925	form	= het.
Oxalis europaea f. villicaulis Wiegand	1925	form	= het.
Oxalis fluminensis var. bushii (Small) H.Hara	1949	variety	= het.
Oxalis fluminensis f. cymosa (Small) H.Hara	1949	form	= het.
Oxalis fluminensis f. pallidiflora (Fernald) H.Hara	1949	form	= het.
Oxalis fluminensis f. pilosella (Wiegand) H.Hara	1949	form	= het.
Oxalis fluminensis f. subglabrata (Wiegand) H.Hara	1949	form	= het.
Oxalis fluminensis f. vestita (Wiegand) H.Hara	1949	form	= het.
Oxalis fluminensis f. villicaulis (Wiegand) H.Hara	1949	form	= het.
Oxalis fontana Bunge	1835	species	= het.
Oxalis fontana var. bushii (Small) H.Hara	1949	variety	= het.
Oxalis fontana var. rufa (Small) Karlsson	1989	variety	= het.
Oxalis interior (Small) R.Knuth	1919	species	= het.
Oxalis lejeunei Rouy	1897	species	= het.
Oxalis longepedunculata Sennen	1927	species	= het.
Oxalis navieri Jord.	1854	species	= het.
Oxalis oneidica House	1923	species	= het.
Oxalis repens var. stricta (L.) Hatus.	1933	variety	≡ hom.
Oxalis rufa Small	1901	species	= het.
Oxalis shinanoensis T.Itô	1909	species	= het.
Oxalis stricta var. bushii (Small) Farw.	1918	variety	= het.
Oxalis stricta f. cymosa (Small) C.F.Reed	1982	form	= het.
Oxalis stricta var. decumbens Bitter	1907	variety	= het.
Oxalis stricta f. decumbens (Bitter) J.Hantz	1979	form	= het.
Oxalis stricta subsp. diffusa (Boenn.) Tourlet	1908	subspecies	= het.
Oxalis stricta var. diffusa Boenn.	1824	variety	= het.
Oxalis stricta var. europaea (Jord.) R.Knuth	1930	variety	= het.
Oxalis stricta var. lejeunei (Rouy) P.Fourn.	1937	variety	= het.
Oxalis stricta var. navieri (Jord.) Nyman	1878	variety	= het.
Oxalis stricta var. piletocarpa Wiegand	1925	variety	= het.
Oxalis stricta var. piletorum Wiegand	1925	variety	= het.
Oxalis stricta var. rufa (Small) Farw.	1918	variety	= het.
Oxalis stricta var. villicaulis (Wiegand) Farw.	1928	variety	= het.
Oxalis stricta f. villicaulis (Wiegand) C.F.Reed	1982	form	= het.
Oxalis stricta var. viridiflora Hus	1907	variety	= het.
Oxalis stricta f. viridiflora (Hus) Fernald	1936	form	= het.
Oxys stricta (L.) All.	1785	species	≡ hom.
Xanthoxalis bushii (Small) Small	1903	species	= het.
Xanthoxalis coloradensis (Rydb.) Rydb.	1906	species	= het.
Xanthoxalis cymosa (Small) Small	1903	species	= het.
Xanthoxalis dillenii var. piletocarpa (Wiegand) Holub	1972	variety	= het.
Xanthoxalis dillenii var. piletorum (Wiegand) Holub	1972	variety	= het.
Xanthoxalis europaea (Jord.) Moldenke	1942	species	= het.
Xanthoxalis europaea var. bushii (Small) Moldenke	1943	variety	= het.
Xanthoxalis europaea f. cymosa (Small) Moldenke	1943	form	= het.
Xanthoxalis europaea f. subglabrata (Wiegand) Moldenke	1943	form	= het.
Xanthoxalis europaea f. vestita (Wiegand) Moldenke	1943	form	= het.
Xanthoxalis europaea f. villicaulis (Wiegand) Moldenke	1944	form	= het.
Xanthoxalis fontana (Bunge) Holub	1972	species	= het.
Xanthoxalis fontana subsp. villicaulis (Wiegand) Tzvelev	1977	subspecies	= het.
Xanthoxalis interior Small	1903	species	= het.
Xanthoxalis rufa (Small) Small	1903	species	= het.
Xanthoxalis stricta (L.) Small	1903	species	≡ hom.
Xanthoxalis stricta var. piletocarpa (Wiegand) Moldenke	1943	variety	= het.
Xanthoxalis stricta subsp. villicaulis (Wiegand) Tzvelev	1996	subspecies	= het.
Xanthoxalis stricta f. viridiflora (Hus) Moldenke	1943	form	= het.
Notes: ≡ homotypic synonym ; = heterotypic synonym

=== Names ===
Oxalis stricta is known by the common name common yellow woodsorrel, also spelled common yellow wood-sorrel and common yellow wood sorrel, but this name has also been applied to Oxalis dillenii. Additionally it is called yellow sheepsorrel, sheep shower, and stickwort.

It is known as sour grass for the agreeably sour flavor of the leaves and unripe pods. Similarly, it is informally called sour clover, sauerkraut, and pickles, particularly by children. Other sour names include sour trefoil, wood sour, pickel plant, and lemon clover. For the shape of its seed capsule it is sometimes named sour bananas.

In the early 1900s it was called lady's sorrel in the United States, however both Oxalis corniculata and Oxalis acetosella are also known as lady's sorrel. It was also known as upright yellow wood-sorrel, sheep sorrel, and sheep poison around the same time in the US.

== Uses ==
=== Culinary ===
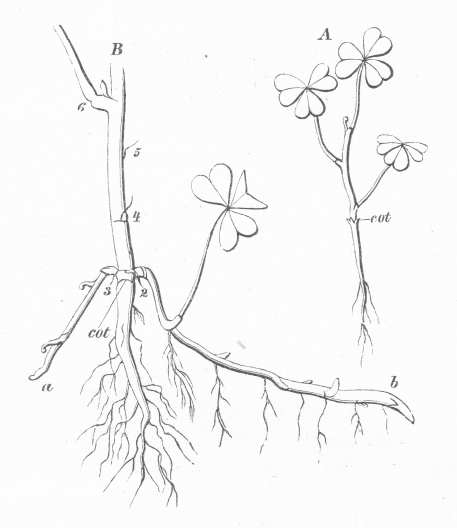
A drawing showing various parts of young O. stricta plants

All parts of the plant are edible, with a distinct tangy flavor (common to all plants in the genus Oxalis). The leaves have a similar taste to lemons. Oxalis stricta is often eaten while hiking or camping. However, it should only be eaten in small quantities, since oxalic acid is an antinutrient and can inhibit the body's absorption of calcium. The sour flavor is eliminated when the plant is cooked.

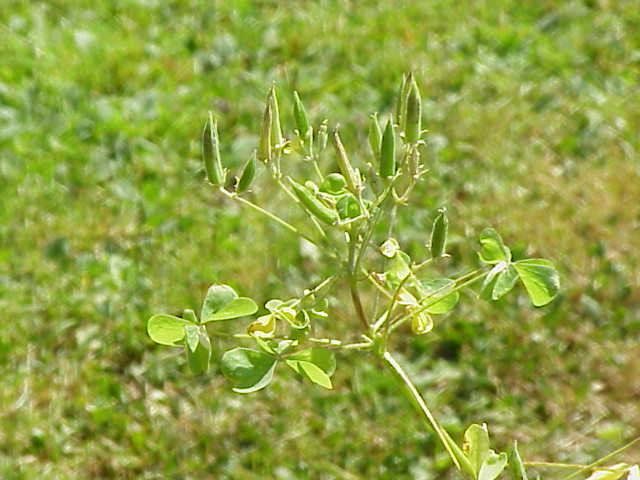
Oxalis stricta, showing seed pods.

The leaves and flowers of the plant are sometimes added to salads for decoration and flavoring. These can also be chewed raw (along with other parts of the plant, but not the root) as a thirst-quencher. The green pods are pleasant raw, having a juicy crisp texture and a tartness similar to rhubarb in flavor.

The leaves can be used to make a flavored drink that is similar in taste to lemonade, and the whole plant can be brewed as herbal tea that has an aroma somewhat like that of cooked green beans.

The juices of the plant have been extracted from its greens as a substitute for common vinegar.

=== Medicinal ===
Oxalis stricta contains large amounts of vitamin C, and has been used to treat scurvy.

A poultice of the plant has been used to treat swellings.

=== Practical ===
An orange dye can be obtained by boiling the whole plant.
