= O. rubra =

O. rubra may refer to:

- Olivella rubra, the dwarf olive, a small sea snail species
- Oxalis rubra, the red woodsorrel or windowbox woodsorrel, a flowering plant species
