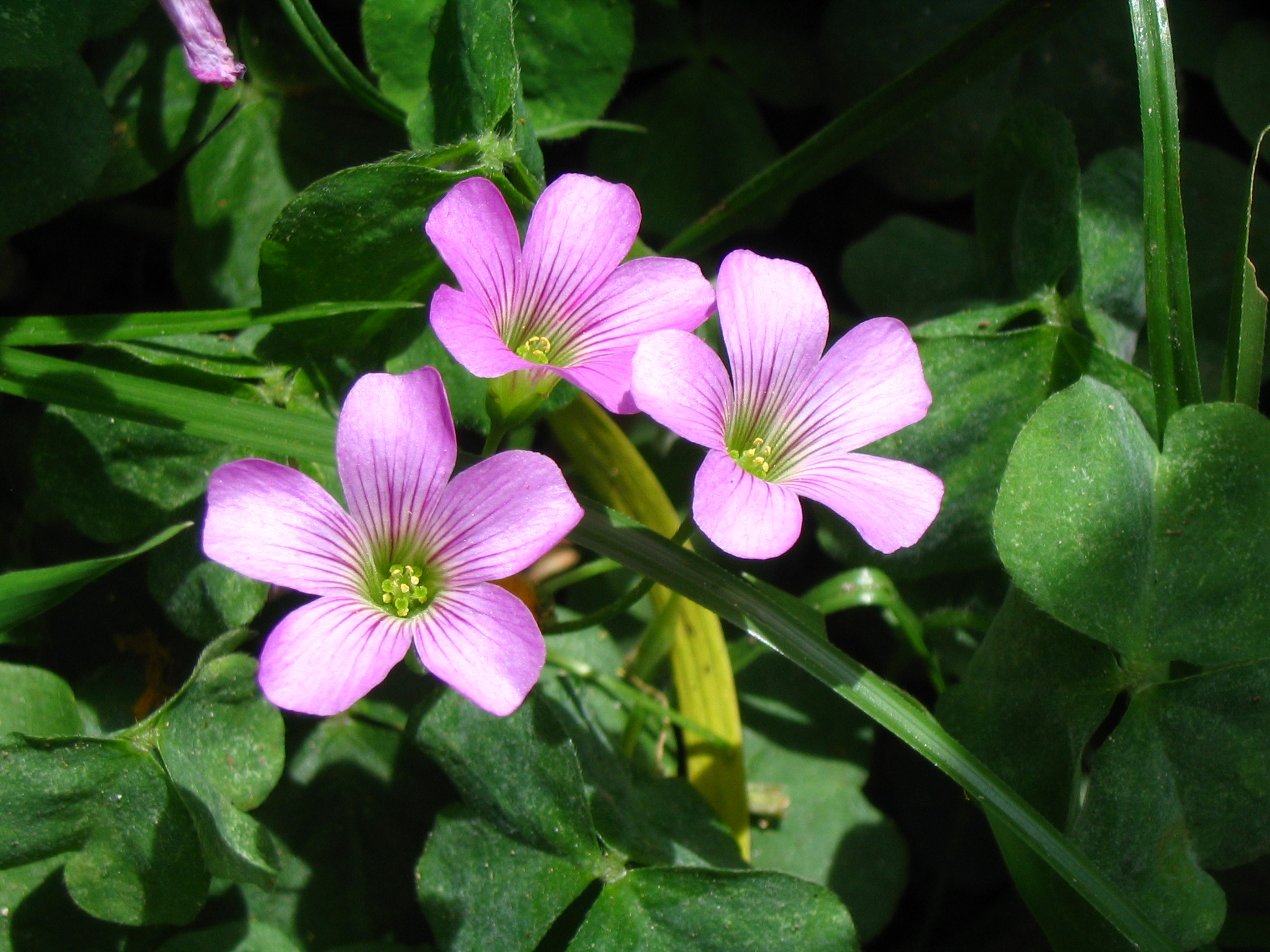

Scientific classification
- Kingdom: Plantae
- Clade: Embryophytes
- Clade: Tracheophytes
- Clade: Angiosperms
- Clade: Eudicots
- Clade: Rosids
- Order: Oxalidales
- Family: Oxalidaceae
- Genus: Oxalis
- Species: O. debilis

Binomial name
- Oxalis debilis Kunth 1822

Varieties
- See text

= Oxalis debilis =

Species of flowering plant

Oxalis debilis, the large-flowered pink-sorrel or pink woodsorrel, is a perennial plant and herb in the family Oxalidaceae. Its original distribution is South America but it has become a cosmopolitan species, occurring in all continents except Antarctica. It can be found in both temperate and tropical areas.

The flowers, leaves and roots are edible. The plant contains oxalic acid, which can cause calcium deficiency if eaten in larger amounts, but typical quantities of the plant would likely not be enough to cause this effect.

== Description ==
It is a bulbous plant. The fruit is a capsule. The seeds are projected, with an elastic integument. In Europe the plants are sterile and are propagating only by bulbs. The leaves have a zesty lemony flavor.

Research on the naturalizing populations in China show the presence of 2 flower morphs, pollen with low viability and polyploidy.

== Varieties and cultivation ==
There are two varieties:

- Oxalis debilis var. corymbosa (DC.) Lourteig – large-flowered pink-sorrel (Synonym : O. corymbosa)
- Oxalis debilis var. debilis

'Aureoreticulata' ('aureo-reticulata') has attractive variegated leaves with flowers that are pinkish purple. This cultivar is also named 'Gold Veined Oxalis' (Yellow Vein Oxalis) with attractive yellow vein foliage. The symptom is associated with the presence of a begomovirus. This virus, designated OxYVV, is transmitted by the whitefly Bemisia tabaci.

The Royal Horticultural Society advises that it can be a serious weed.

== Distribution and habitat ==
Its original distribution is South America but it has become a cosmopolitan species, occurring in all continents except Antarctica. It can be found in both temperate and tropical areas.

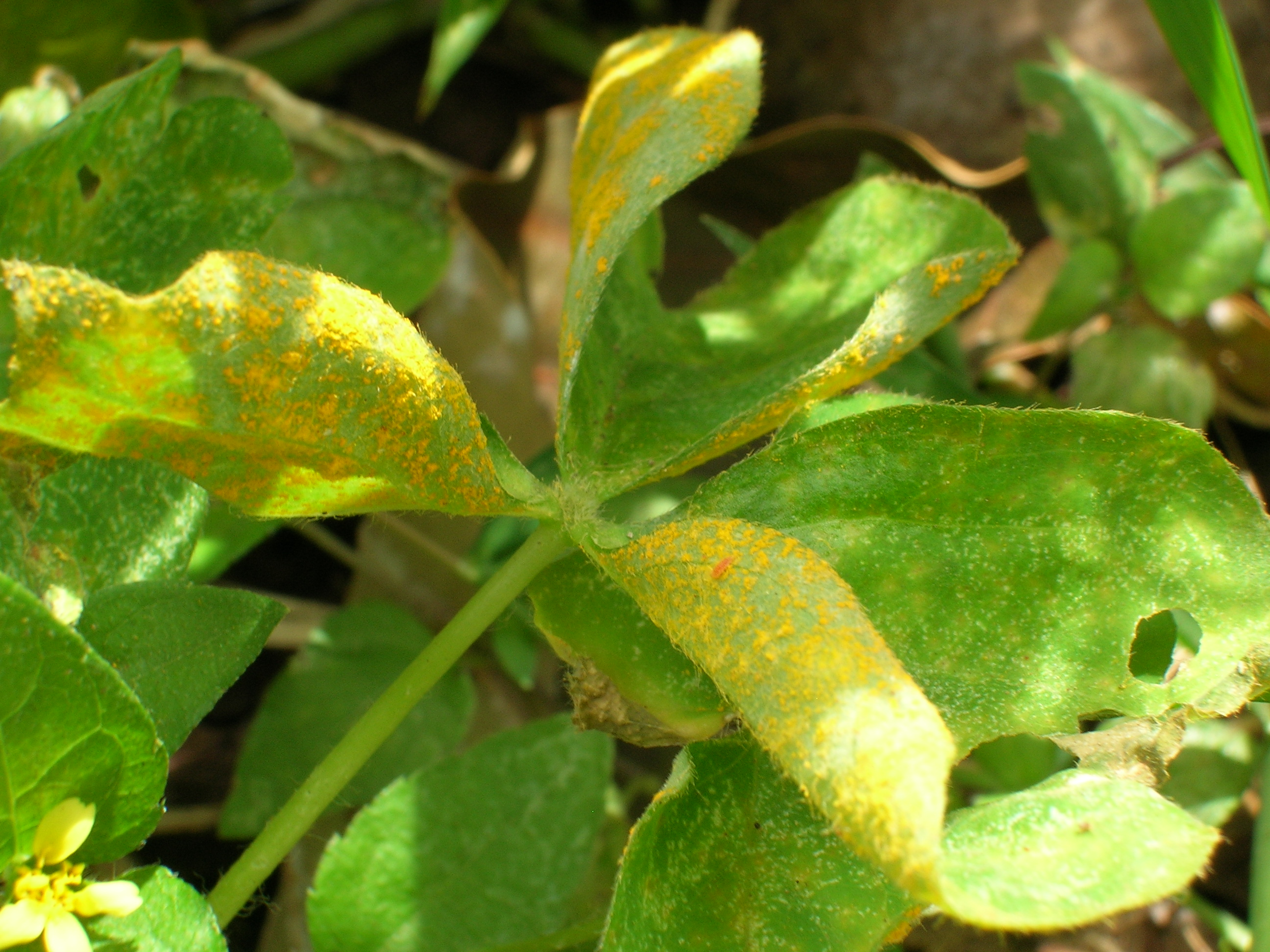
Puccinia oxalidis on leaves of Oxalis debilis var. corymbosa (Location: Maui, Makawao)

=== Pests and diseases ===
Puccinia oxalidis is a fungus species in the genus Puccinia. This species is a causal agent of rust on plants in the genus Oxalis.

== Uses ==
The flowers, leaves and roots are edible. There is concern that the plant should only be consumed in small amounts because it contains oxalic acid, which can cause calcium deficiency if eaten in larger amounts. Studies show that this is an exaggerated fear.

== See also ==
- List of the vascular plants of Britain and Ireland 6
- List of vascular plants of Norfolk Island
