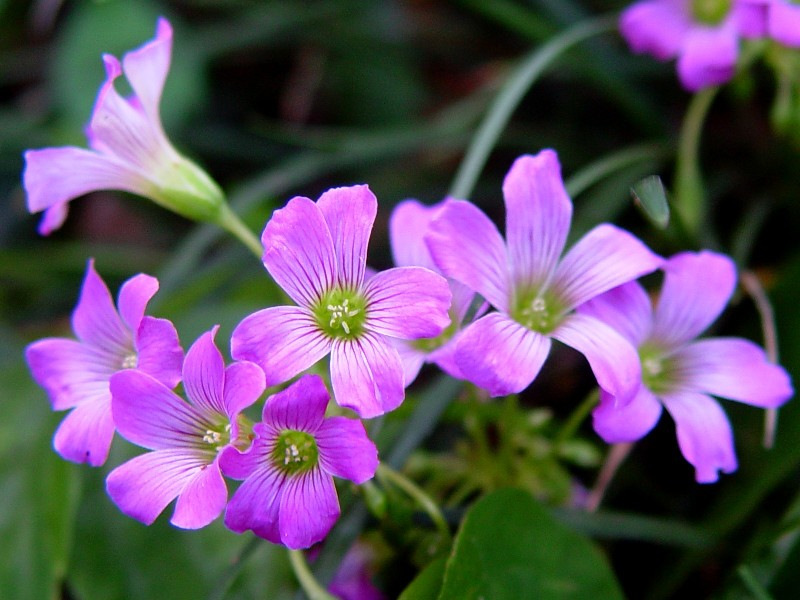

Scientific classification
- Kingdom: Plantae
- Clade: Tracheophytes
- Clade: Angiosperms
- Clade: Eudicots
- Clade: Rosids
- Order: Oxalidales
- Family: Oxalidaceae
- Genus: Oxalis
- Species: O. rubra

Binomial name
- Oxalis rubra A.St.-Hil.

= Oxalis rubra =

Species of flowering plant

Oxalis rubra is a species of flowering plant in the woodsorrel family known by the common names red woodsorrel, red oxalis, and windowbox woodsorrel. It is sometimes considered a subspecies of Oxalis articulata. It is native to Argentina, Brazil, and Uruguay, but it is widely cultivated as an ornamental plant and can sometimes be found growing in the wild as a garden escapee. This is a perennial herb growing from a woody rhizome. There is generally no stem, the leaves arising on long petioles from ground level. Each leaf is made up of three leaflets, which can vary in shape but are often heart-shaped. The inflorescence is a loose array of white to purple-pink flowers.
