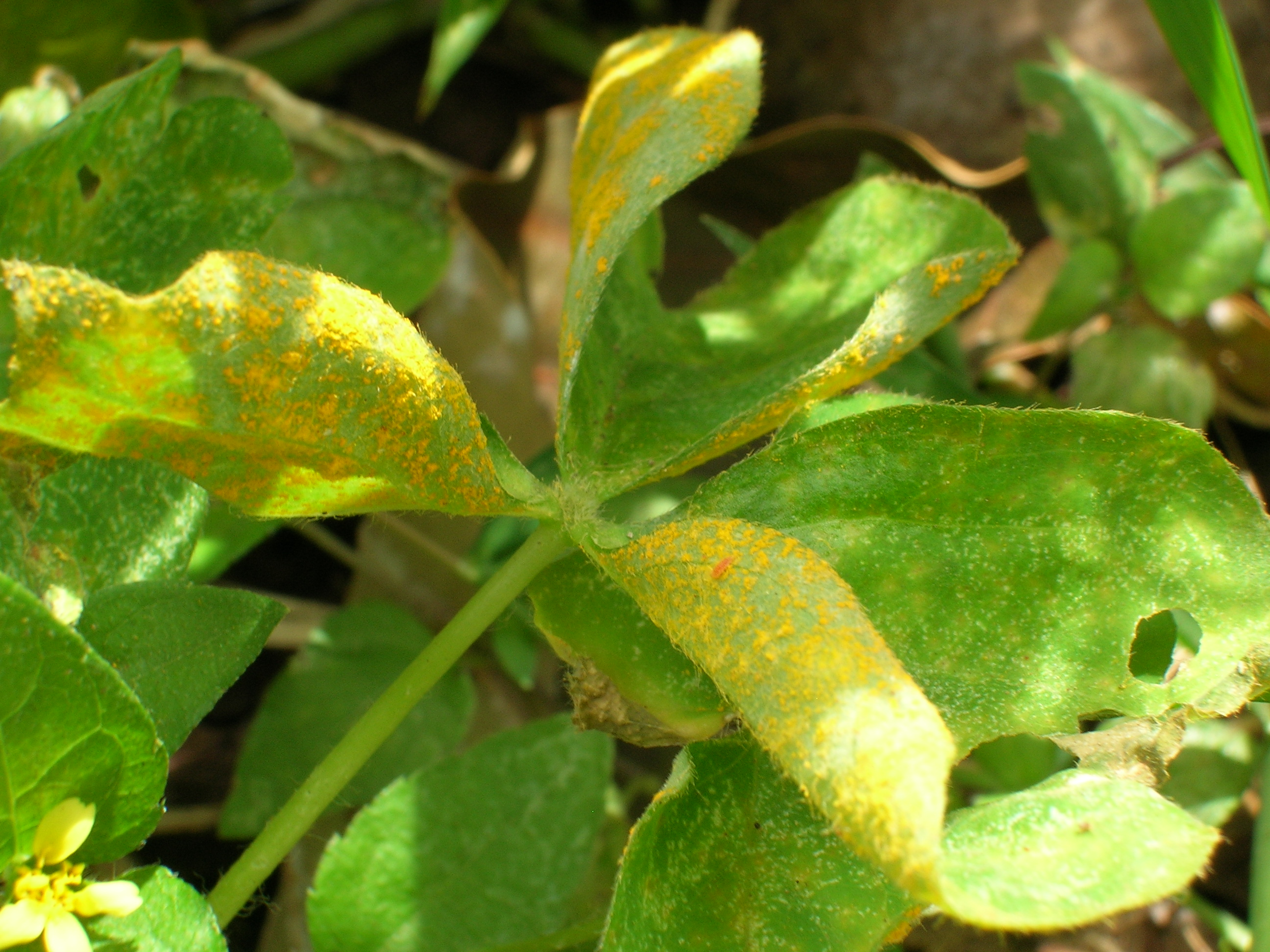
- Puccinia oxalidis on leaves of Oxalis debilis var. corymbosa (Location: Maui, Makawao)

Scientific classification
- Domain: Eukaryota
- Kingdom: Fungi
- Division: Basidiomycota
- Class: Pucciniomycetes
- Order: Pucciniales
- Family: Pucciniaceae
- Genus: Puccinia
- Species: P. oxalidis

Binomial name
- Puccinia oxalidis Dietel & Ellis (1895)

Synonyms
- Argomyces oxalidis (Lév.) Arthur, N. Amer. Fl. (New York) 7(3): 217 (1912); Caeoma canum Bonord., Abh. naturforsch. Ges. Halle 5: 174 (1860); Dicaeoma oxalidis (Dietel & Ellis) Kuntze, Revis. gen. pl. (Leipzig) 3(3): 469 (1898); Trichobasis oxalidis (Lév.) Lév., in Orbigny, Dict. Univ. Hist. Nat. 12: 785 (1849); Uredo oxalidis Lév., Annls Sci. Nat., Bot., sér. 2 16: 240 (1841); Uromyces oxalidis (Lév.) Lév., Annls Sci. Nat., Bot., sér. 3 8: 371 (1847)

= Puccinia oxalidis =

Species of fungus

Puccinia oxalidis is a fungus species in the genus Puccinia. This species is a causal agent of rust on plants in the genus Oxalis, such as Oxalis articulata. The disease appears as yellow dots on the reverse of the leaves. The aecial stage can also be found on Berberis repens. It was originally found on Oxalis species in Mexico.

== See also ==
- List of Puccinia species
