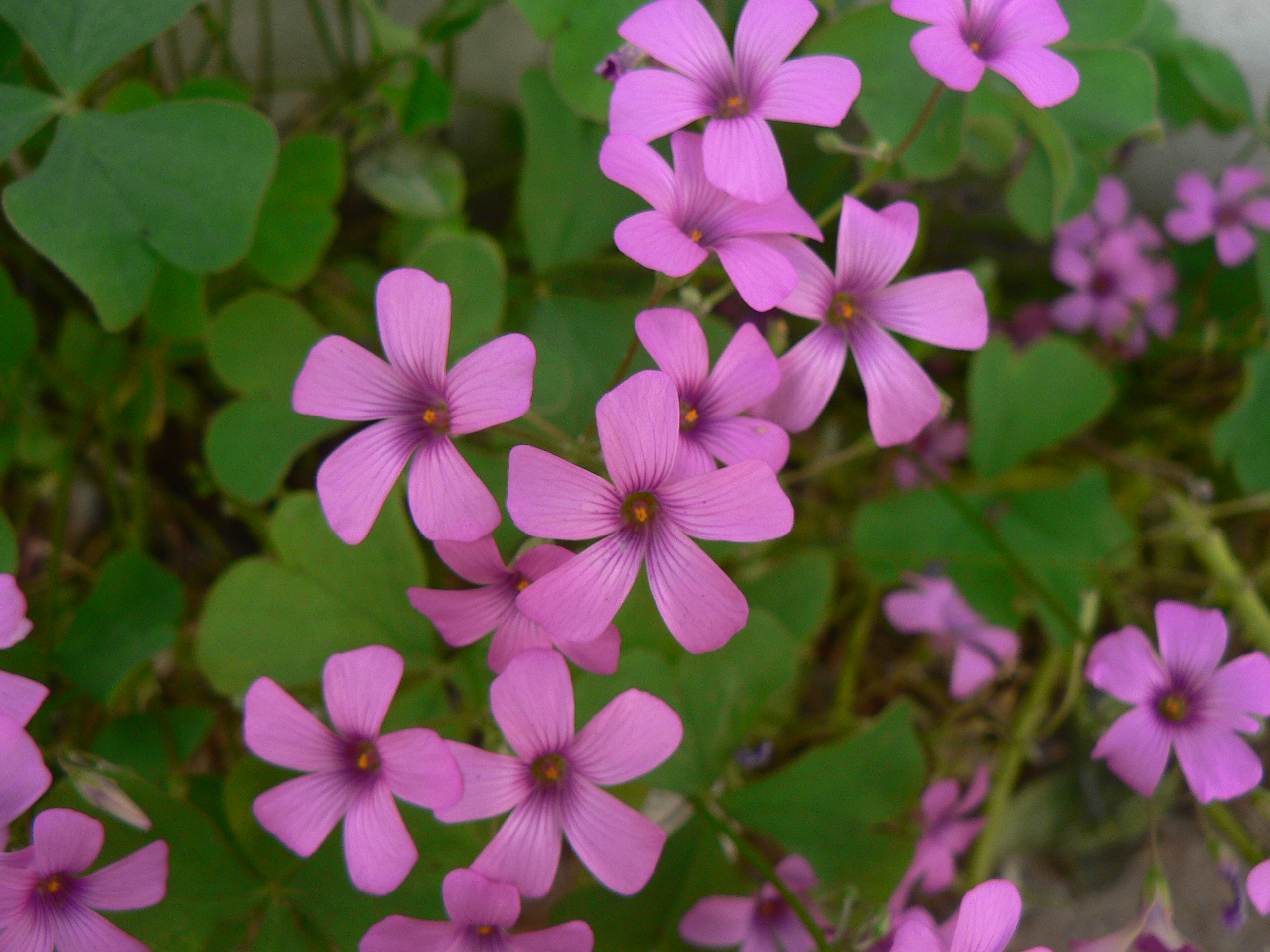

Scientific classification
- Kingdom: Plantae
- Clade: Embryophytes
- Clade: Tracheophytes
- Clade: Spermatophytes
- Clade: Angiosperms
- Clade: Eudicots
- Clade: Rosids
- Order: Oxalidales
- Family: Oxalidaceae
- Genus: Oxalis
- Species: O. articulata

Binomial name
- Oxalis articulata Savign. (1798)

Subspecies
- Oxalis articulata Savign. forma crassipes (Urb.)Lourteig, 1982; Oxalis articulata Savign. subspecies rubra (A.St.-Hil.) Lourteig, 1982

Synonyms
- Oxalis rubra

= Oxalis articulata =

Species of flowering plant

Oxalis articulata, known as pink-sorrel, pink wood sorrel, windowbox wood-sorrel, sourgrass, is a perennial species of flowering plant in the genus Oxalis native to Northern Argentina, Southern Brazil and Uruguay. It has been introduced in Europe in gardens and is now naturalized in these areas.

The plant is susceptible to rust (disease due to the fungus Puccinia oxalidis).

== Description ==
As the name would imply, this species of Oxalis typically has pink to violet flowers with petals 10–15 mm long. Numerous tufted leaves emerge from the ground in a rosette. At the end of a long, slender petiole (up to 30 cm), 3 generally orbicular leaflets (5 cm in diameter) spread out perpendicular to the petiole. Each leaflet is obcordate (heart-shaped), with a very finely ciliated margin, and a deeply notched apex. The underside of the leaflets generally bears clearly visible orange granulations.

This species has "plants arising from a thick, woody, irregularly nodulate-segmented rhizome often with persistent, thickened, and lignescent petiole bases; flowers 3–12 in umbelliform cymes, less commonly in irregular cymes".

The plant is a perennial and typically grows up to 45 cm tall and 2 cm in diameter. It spreads by rhizomes (up to 15 cm) to form colonies. It is hermaphrodite and also infrequently produces seeds in long, cylindrical capsules.

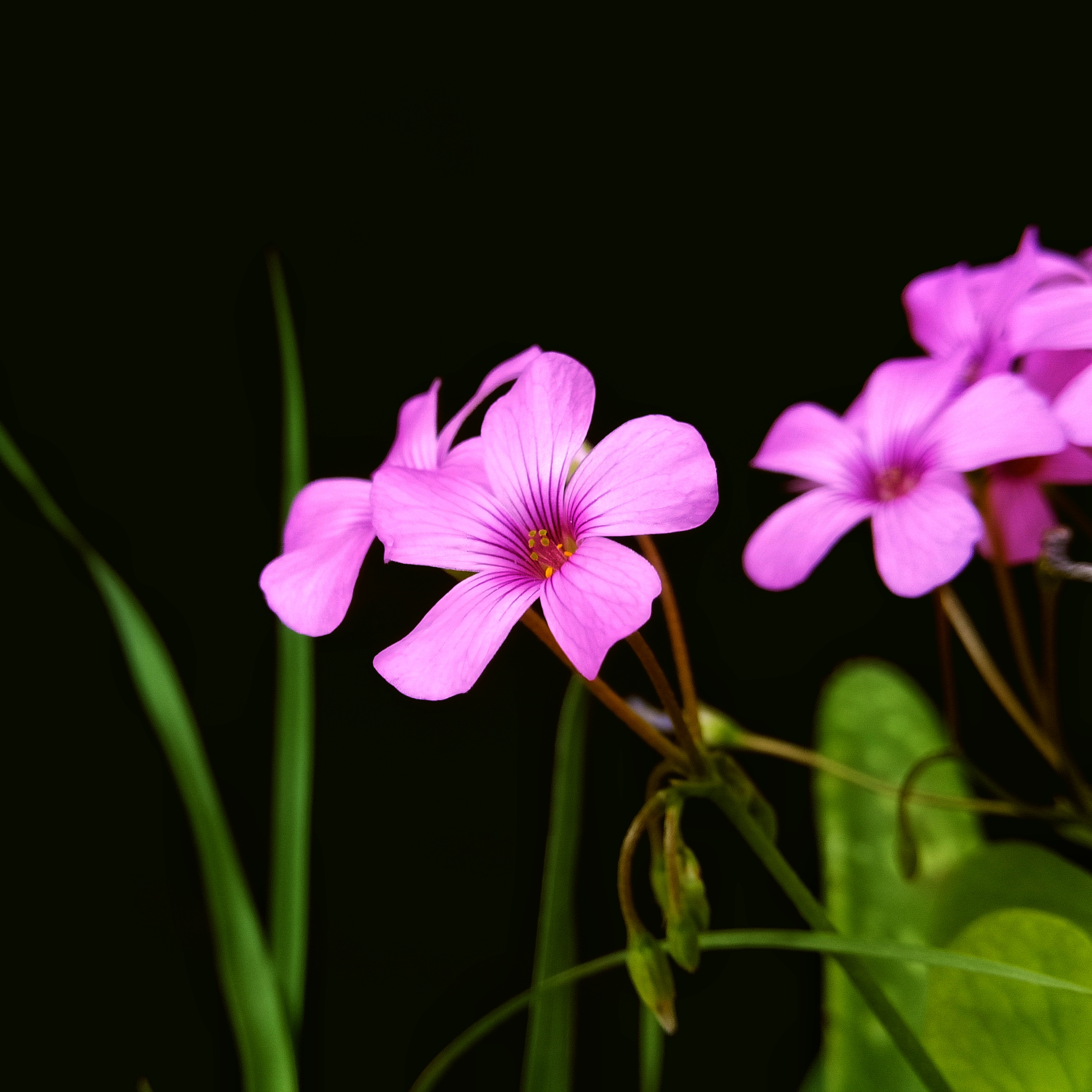

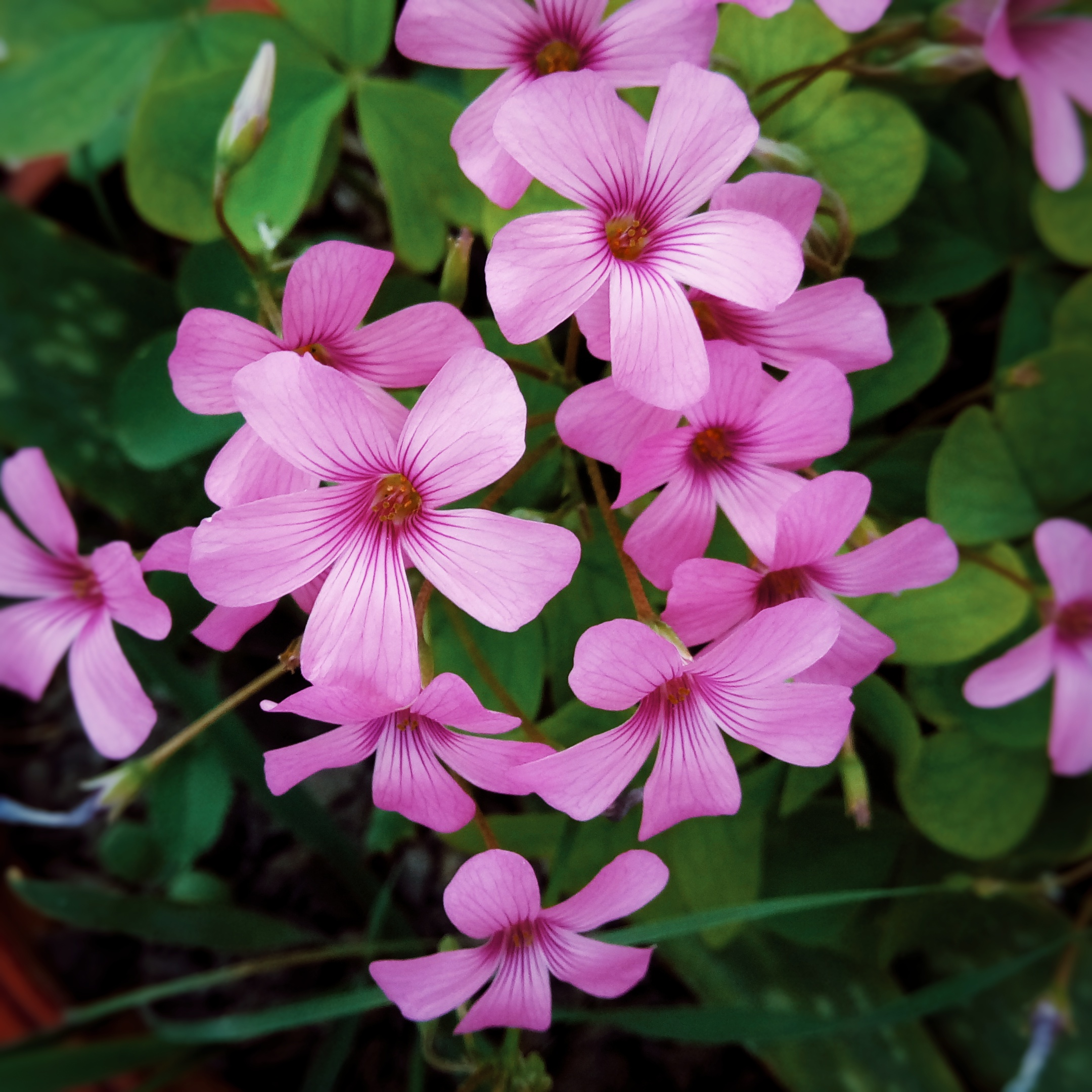

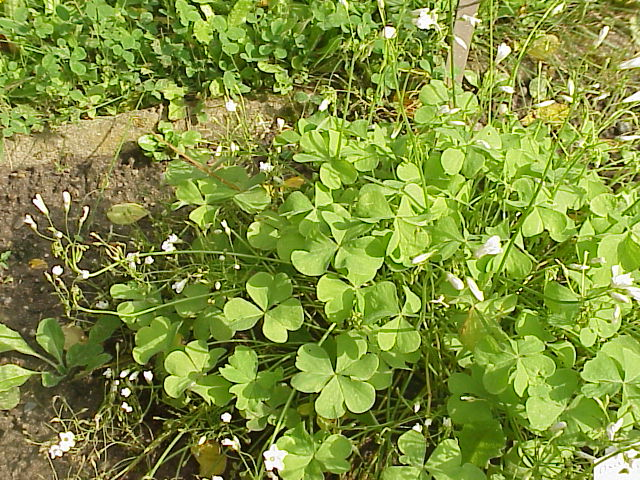
O. articulata f. crassipes

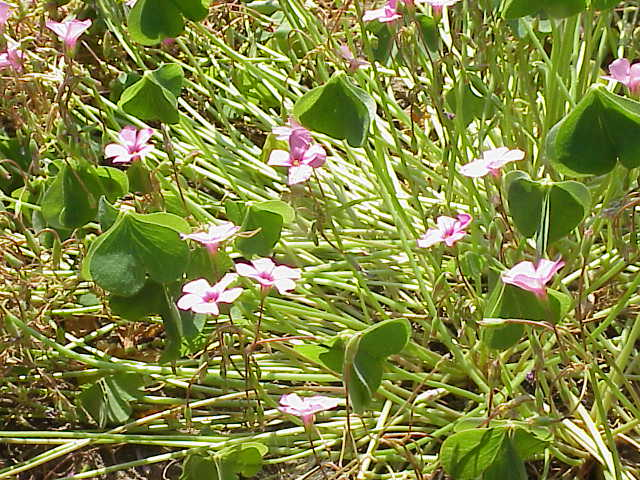
O. articulata ssp. rubra

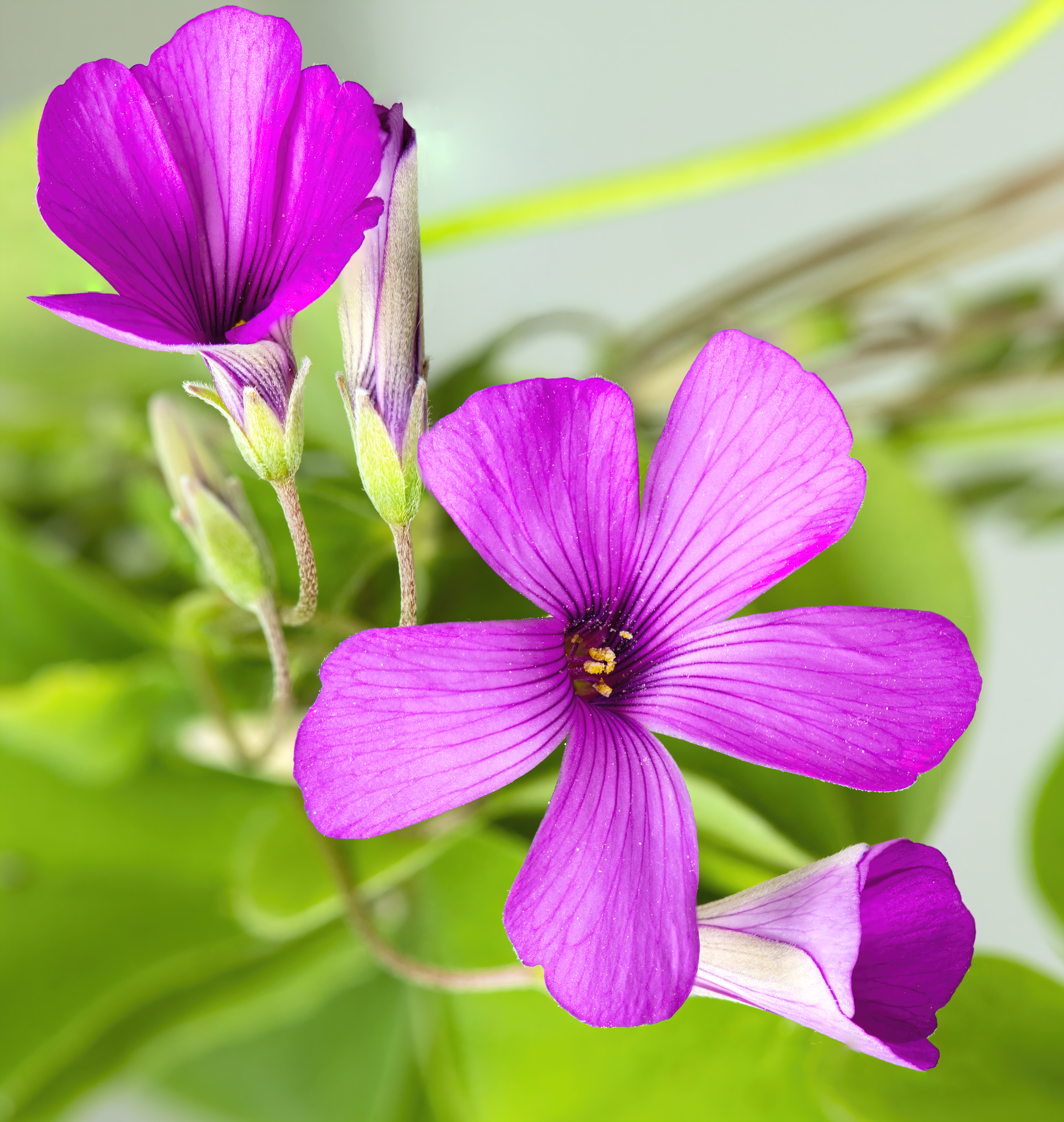
Flowers

== Uses ==
Oxalis articulata can be used as ground cover in green zones to inhibit the growth of weeds in such areas and alleviate the need for herbicide. This is due to the allelopathic leachates in the leaves and exudates from the roots of living Oxalis plants which display significant inhibitory activities on the growth of other plants. Oxalate extracts from the leaves have been shown to exhibit anti-fungal properties.

Oxalis articulata has a large amount of ascorbic acid and is eaten as a vegetable by inhabitants of Jharkhand, India.

=== Cultivation ===
Oxalis articulata is used as an ornamental in China. The plant is not drought tolerant and soil should be kept moist. It grows best in acid or light soils. Oxalis articulata is more competitive than other species in this family, and can tolerate plant beds which are loosely populated with other greenery. However, it thrives in disturbed ground. Though it is hardy, it grows best in warmer areas. It flowers continuously from throughout the warmer months and goes dormant at first frost. Out of the sun, the flowers roll up into a tube-like shape. It is extensively naturalized in southeastern Australia, particularly in the crescent-shaped, temperate strip from South Australia to southeastern Queensland.

== Control ==
It is regarded as a weed in many places, including South Australia, New South Wales, and Victoria. As it spreads through rhizomes, care should be taken when removing to avoid leaving behind bulbs. Digging the bulbs out while soil is moist when removing can help this process.

== See also ==
- List of the vascular plants of Britain and Ireland 6
- List of plants in the Gibraltar Botanic Gardens
