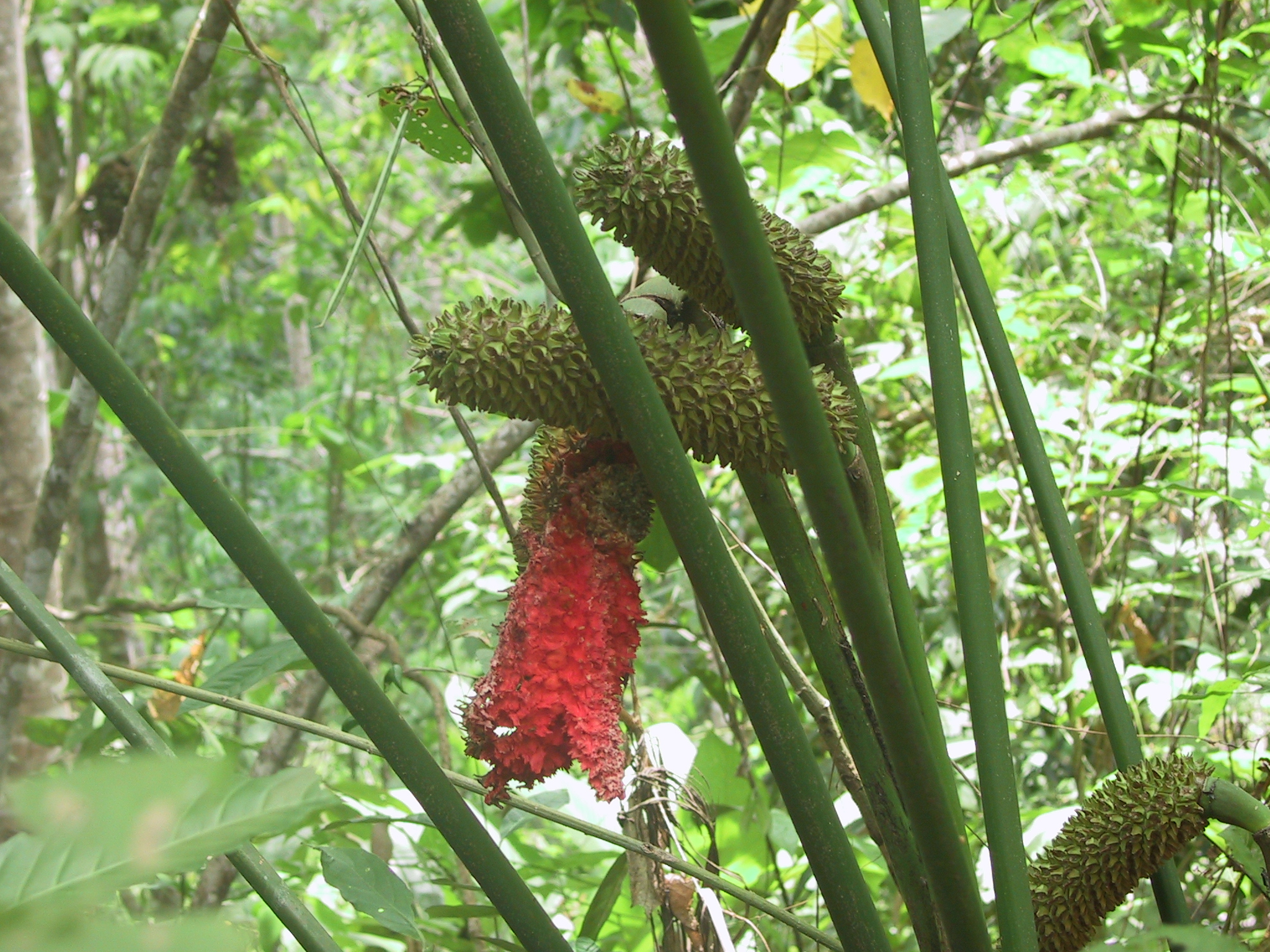
- Carludovica drudei inflorescences

Scientific classification
- Kingdom: Plantae
- Clade: Tracheophytes
- Clade: Angiosperms
- Clade: Monocots
- Order: Pandanales
- Family: Cyclanthaceae
- Genus: Carludovica; Ruiz & Pav.

Synonyms
- Ludovia Pers., rejected name; Salmia Willd. 1811 not Cav. 1795 nor Post & Kuntze 1903 nor Hort. Sander. ex Gard. Chron.

= Carludovica =

Genus of flowering plants

Carludovica is a genus in the family Cyclanthaceae. It is native to tropical America, from southern Mexico and Guatemala to Ecuador and Bolivia. Carludovica is named in honor of Charles IV of Spain and his wife Maria Luisa of Parma.

== Cultivation and uses ==
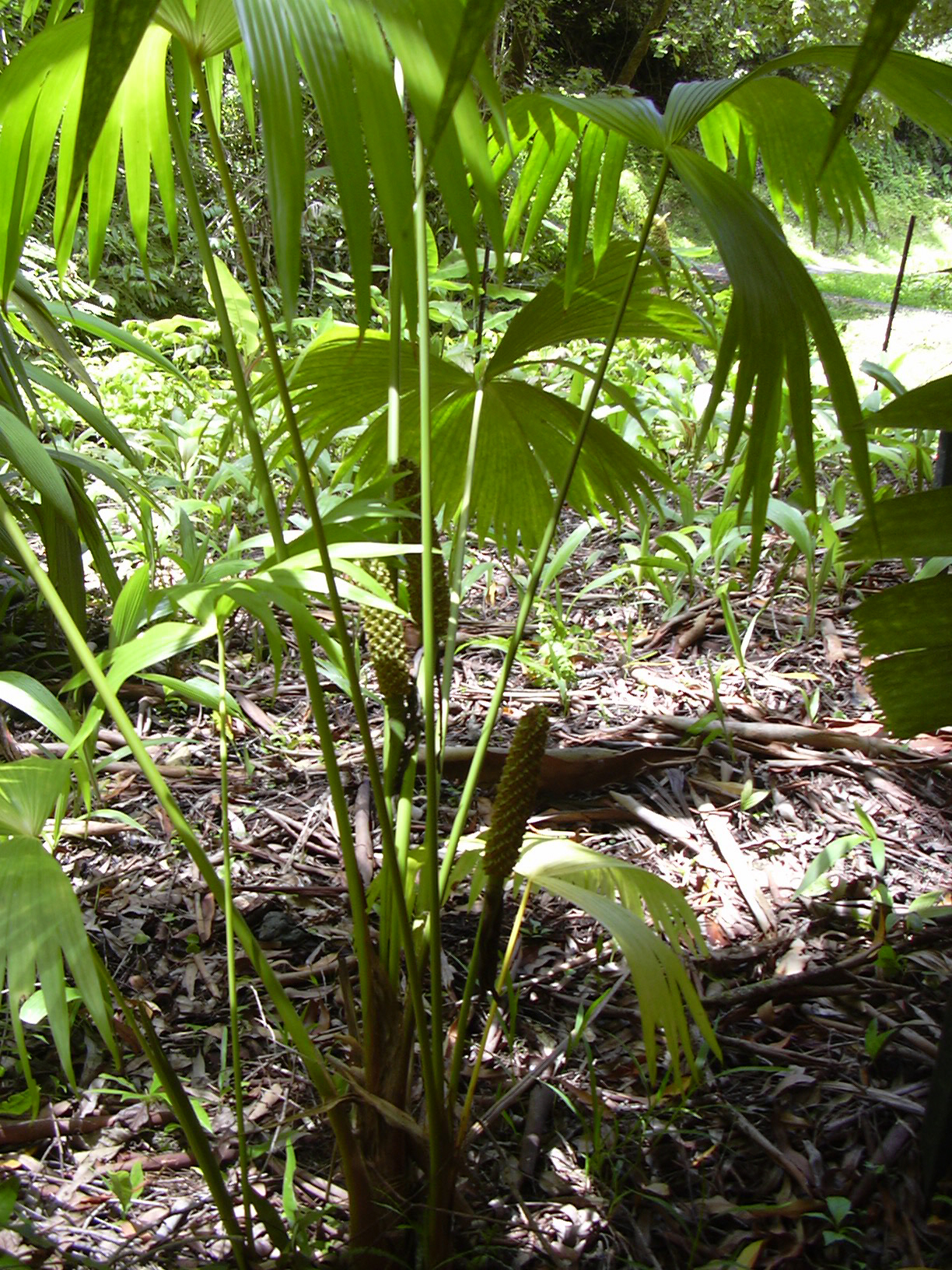
Carludovica palmata, from which Panama hats are made.

The genus is probably best known for Carludovica palmata (toquilla), the young leaves of which are made into Panama hats.

An unidentified species belonging to this family (possibly a Carludovica species) has been marketed as a houseplant in the United States under the name "Jungle Drum".

== Lists of species ==
According to Kew World Checklist of Selected Plant Families, there are four species

- Carludovica drudei Mast. - Chiapas, Oaxaca, Tabasco, Costa Rica, Guatemala, Panama, Colombia, Ecuador, Venezuela
- Carludovica palmata Ruiz & Pav. - widespread from Tabasco to Bolivia
- Carludovica rotundifolia Schaedtler - Costa Rica, Guatemala, Honduras, Panama
- Carludovica sulcata Hammel - Nicaragua, Costa Rica

Tropicos lists more species but it may contain potential synonyms:

- C. acuminata
- C. angustifolia
- C. angustissima
- C. asplundii
- C. atropurpurea
- C. atrovirens
- C. aurantiaca
- C. brachypus
- C. bracteosa
- C. caput-medusae
- C. caribaea
- C. caulescens
- C. chelidonura
- C. chiapensis
- C. coma-pyrrhae
- C. coronata
- C. costaricensis
- C. crenifolia
- C. decurrens
- C. dentata
- C. disticha
- C. divergens (syn. of Asplundia divergens)
- C. drudei
- C. ecuadoriensis
- C. elegans
- C. ensiformis
- C. euryphylla
- C. fanshawei
- C. fimbriata
- C. funifera
- C. gardneri
- C. gigantea (syn. of C. palmata)
- C. glandulosa
- C. glauca
- C. goebelii
- C. gracilis
- C. helicotricha
- C. heterophylla
- C. hookeri
- C. horrida
- C. humilis
- C. imperialis
- C. incisa (syn. of C. palmata)
- C. insignis
- C. insularis
- C. integrifolia
- C. irazuensis
- C. kegeliana
- C. killipii
- C. labela
- C. lancifolia
- C. latifolia
- C. latifrons
- C. laucheana
- C. leucocarpa
- C. longicomans
- C. longicrura
- C. longipes
- C. macropoda
- C. marceana
- C. mattogrossensis
- C. mexicana
- C. microcarpa
- C. microcephala
- C. microphylla
- C. moritziana
- C. nana
- C. nobilis
- C. oerstedii
- C. palmata
- C. palmifolia
- C. parvula
- C. phacospatha
- C. pittieri
- C. plicata
- C. plumerii
- C. polymera
- C. pygmaea
- C. quitoensis
- C. rheithrophila
- C. rhodocephala
- C. rigida
- C. rivularis
- C. rotundifolia
- C. rupestris
- C. sarmentosa
- C. sartori
- C. scandens
- C. schizophylla
- C. sellowiana
- C. serpens
- C. serrata
- C. stenophylla
- C. steyermarkii
- C. stylaris
- C. subacaulis
- C. sulcata
- C. tabascana
- C. tetragona
- C. tetragonopus
- C. tocoso
- C. trailiana
- C. trigona
- C. tristicha
- C. utilis
- C. vestita
- C. wallisii
- C. williamsii
