= Asplundia ceci =

Scientific classification
- Kingdom: Plantae
- Clade: Tracheophytes
- Clade: Angiosperms
- Clade: Monocots
- Order: Pandanales
- Family: Cyclanthaceae
- Genus: Asplundia
- Species: A. ceci

Binomial name
- Asplundia ceci Hammel, 2003

Species of flowering plant

Asplundia ceci is a species of plant belonging to the family Cyclanthaceae. It occasionally grows terrestrially but is usually a highly branched liana with reddish brown stems of 15 m or longer. Petioles up to 40 cm long bear deeply bifid leaves up to 50 cm long.

This plant has a wide but scattered distribution from Costa Rica to northwestern Colombia. It is found in primary rainforest habitats.
