= Asplundia nonoensis =

Conservation status
- Endangered (IUCN 3.1)

Scientific classification
- Kingdom: Plantae
- Clade: Tracheophytes
- Clade: Angiosperms
- Clade: Monocots
- Order: Pandanales
- Family: Cyclanthaceae
- Genus: Asplundia
- Species: A. nonoensis

Binomial name
- Asplundia nonoensis Harling

Species of flowering plant

Asplundia nonoensis is a species of plant in the Cyclanthaceae family. It is endemic to Ecuador. Its natural habitat is subtropical or tropical moist montane forests.
