= Asplundia albicarpa =

Scientific classification
- Kingdom: Plantae
- Clade: Tracheophytes
- Clade: Angiosperms
- Clade: Monocots
- Order: Pandanales
- Family: Cyclanthaceae
- Genus: Asplundia
- Species: A. albicarpa

Binomial name
- Asplundia albicarpa Hammel 2003

Species of flowering plant

Asplundia albicarpa is a species of plant belonging to the family Cyclanthaceae. It has a long stem up to 2 m long with petioles up to 52 cm long carrying broad bifid leaves up to 65 cm long. It can be distinguished from most of its congeners by its fruit which remain white or greenish white when mature (The fruit of most Asplundia spp turn a variety of different colours upon maturity). A. albicarpa grows both as an epiphyte and as a terrestrial plant.

It is found in primary rainforest habitats from Costa Rica south to Colombia and Ecuador.
