= Asplundia brunneistigma =

Scientific classification
- Kingdom: Plantae
- Clade: Tracheophytes
- Clade: Angiosperms
- Clade: Monocots
- Order: Pandanales
- Family: Cyclanthaceae
- Genus: Asplundia
- Species: A. brunneistigma

Binomial name
- Asplundia brunneistigma Hammel 2003

Species of flowering plant

Asplundia brunneistigma is a species of largely terrestrial plant (although sometimes shortly climbing) belonging to the family Cyclanthaceae. It has a long stem up to 2 (exceptionally 3) m long bearing petioles up to 40 cm long terminating in shallowly bifid leaves up to 75 cm long.

This plant is found in primary rainforest habitats from Costa Rica to Panama.
