= Asplundia fagerlindii =

Conservation status
- Near Threatened (IUCN 3.1)

Scientific classification
- Kingdom: Plantae
- Clade: Tracheophytes
- Clade: Angiosperms
- Clade: Monocots
- Order: Pandanales
- Family: Cyclanthaceae
- Genus: Asplundia
- Species: A. fagerlindii

Binomial name
- Asplundia fagerlindii Harling

Species of flowering plant

Asplundia fagerlindii is a species of plant in the Cyclanthaceae family. It is endemic to Ecuador. Its natural habitats are subtropical or tropical moist lowland forests and subtropical or tropical moist montane forests.
