= Asplundia allenii =

Scientific classification
- Kingdom: Plantae
- Clade: Tracheophytes
- Clade: Angiosperms
- Clade: Monocots
- Order: Pandanales
- Family: Cyclanthaceae
- Genus: Asplundia
- Species: A. allenii

Binomial name
- Asplundia allenii Hammel 2003

Species of flowering plant

Asplundia alleni is a species of terrestrial plant belonging to the family Cyclanthaceae. This is a very distinctive plant: The stem is very short or absent but the petioles are up to 1.5 m long and bear palmate leaves, split into as many as 30 divisions up to 75 cm long.

This is a rare plant with a very limited distribution in central and eastern Panama.
