= Carludovica elegans =

Scientific classification
- Kingdom: Plantae
- Clade: Embryophytes
- Clade: Tracheophytes
- Clade: Spermatophytes
- Clade: Angiosperms
- Clade: Monocots
- Order: Pandanales
- Family: Cyclanthaceae
- Genus: Carludovica
- Species: C. elegans

Binomial name
- Carludovica elegans Dammer ex Huber, 1906

Synonyms
- Carludovica elegans hort. ex Gentil; Carludovica elegans Williams ex BAiley

Species of plant

Carludovica elegans is a species of flowering plant in the family Cyclanthaceae. It is found in Peru.
