= Asplundia stenophylla =

Scientific classification
- Kingdom: Plantae
- Clade: Tracheophytes
- Clade: Angiosperms
- Clade: Monocots
- Order: Pandanales
- Family: Cyclanthaceae
- Genus: Asplundia
- Species: A. stenophylla

Binomial name
- Asplundia stenophylla Standley 1937

Species of flowering plant

Asplundia stenophylla is a species of plant belonging to the family Cyclanthaceae. It occasionally grows terrestrially but is usually a climbing epiphyte. The stem is up to 5 m long, bearing petioles up to 44 cm long which terminate in very distinctive leaves: very deeply bifid, deeply corrugated and up to 77 cm long.

This is a commonly encountered species in cloud forests from Costa Rica to Ecuador.
