= Dicranopygium tatica =

Scientific classification
- Kingdom: Plantae
- Clade: Tracheophytes
- Clade: Angiosperms
- Clade: Monocots
- Order: Pandanales
- Family: Cyclanthaceae
- Genus: Dicranopygium
- Species: D. tatica

Binomial name
- Dicranopygium tatica Hammel 2003

Species of flowering plant

Dicranopygium tatica is a plant belonging to the family Cyclanthaceae. This is a local species, found (often on cliffs) near the Caribbean coast of Costa Rica. It can easily be distinguished from its congeners by having a very short stem with petioles up to 57 cm long terminating in long (up to 53 cm) very narrow, deeply bifid leaves.
