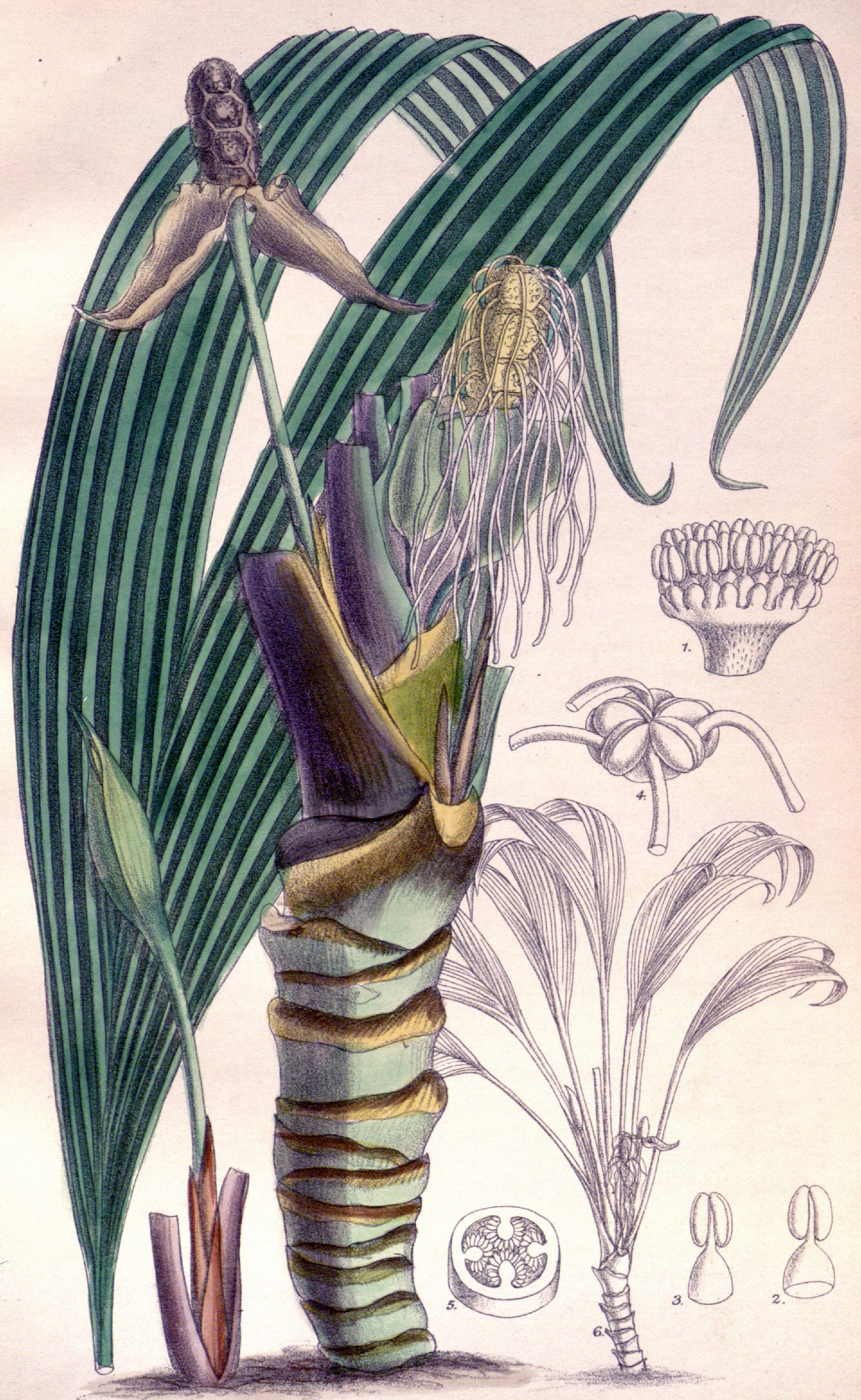
- Dicranopygium microcephalum

Scientific classification
- Kingdom: Plantae
- Clade: Tracheophytes
- Clade: Angiosperms
- Clade: Monocots
- Order: Pandanales
- Family: Cyclanthaceae
- Genus: Dicranopygium; Harling 1954

= Dicranopygium =

Genus of flowering plants

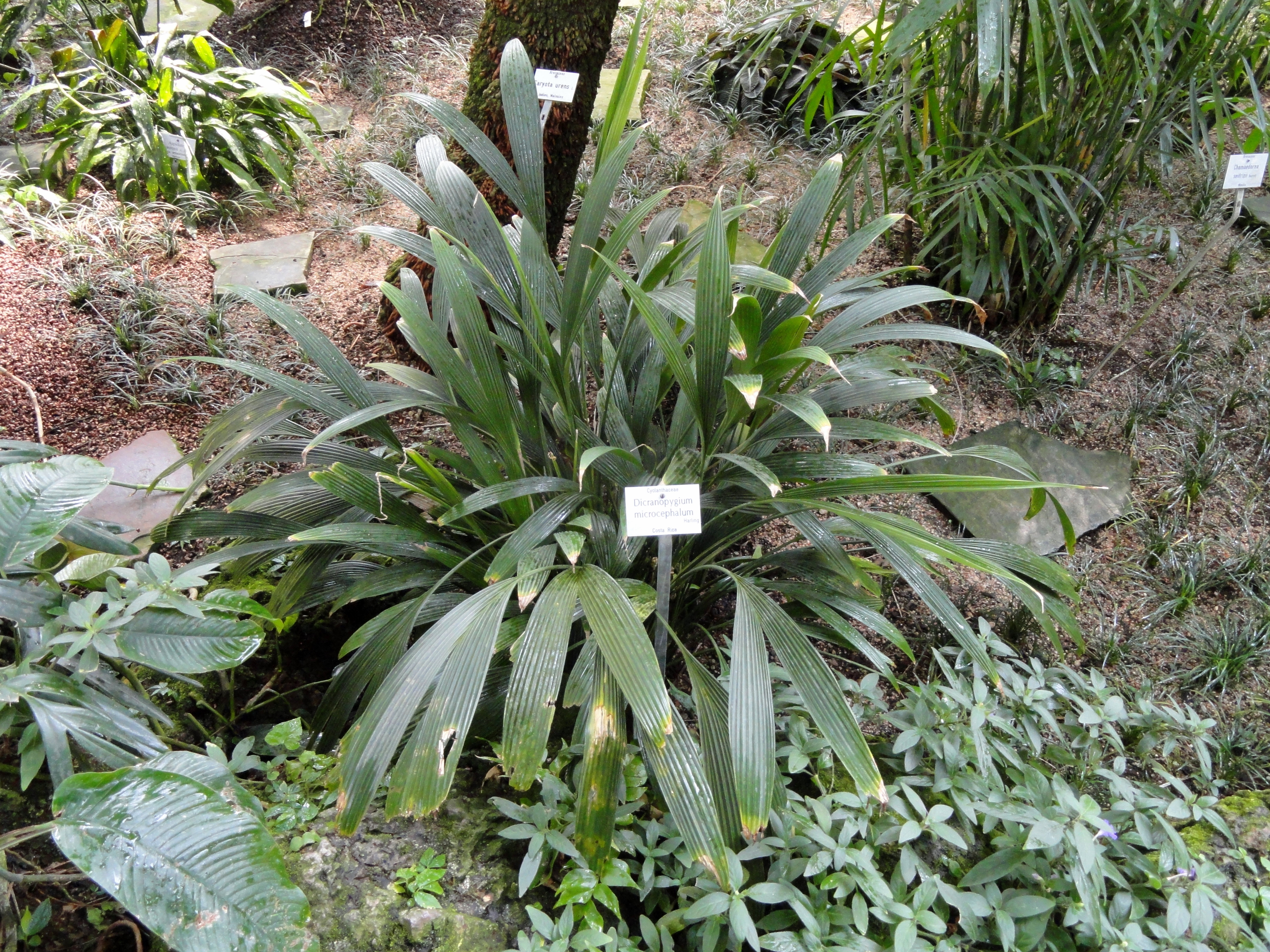
Dicranopygium microcephalum

Dicranopygium is a genus of plants belonging to the family Cyclanthaceae, first described as a genus in 1954. They are distributed in the Neotropical realm from southern Mexico to Peru.

== Species ==
Species include:

- Dicranopygium amazonicum - NW Brazil
- Dicranopygium angustissimum - Guyana
- Dicranopygium aristeguietae - Venezuela
- Dicranopygium arusisense - Colombia
- Dicranopygium atrovirens - Colombia
- Dicranopygium aurantiacum - Colombia
- Dicranopygium bolivarense - Venezuela
- Dicranopygium calimense - Colombia, Ecuador
- Dicranopygium callithrix - Colombia
- Dicranopygium campii - Ecuador
- Dicranopygium coma-pyrrhae - Ecuador
- Dicranopygium crinitum - Panama
- Dicranopygium cuatrecasanum - Panama, Colombia, Ecuador
- Dicranopygium dolichostemon - Colombia
- Dicranopygium euryphyllum - Ecuador
- Dicranopygium fissile - Colombia
- Dicranopygium globosum - Colombia
- Dicranopygium goudotii - Colombia
- Dicranopygium gracile - Veracruz, Oaxaca, Guatemala, Honduras, Nicaragua
- Dicranopygium grandifolium - Costa Rica, Colombia, Venezuela, Ecuador
- Dicranopygium harlingii - Costa Rica, Panama
- Dicranopygium idrobonis - Colombia
- Dicranopygium imeriense - Guyana, Venezuela, NW Brazil
- Dicranopygium insulare - Tobago
- Dicranopygium latissimum - Peru
- Dicranopygium lugonis - Ecuador, Peru
- Dicranopygium macrophyllum - Venezuela
- Dicranopygium microcephalum - Costa Rica, Honduras
- Dicranopygium mirabile - Colombia
- Dicranopygium nanum - Guyana, Venezuela
- Dicranopygium novogranatense - Colombia
- Dicranopygium odoratum - Colombia
- Dicranopygium omichlophilum - Venezuela, Colombia
- Dicranopygium pachystemon - Peru
- Dicranopygium parvulum - Colombia
- Dicranopygium polycephalum - Colombia
- Dicranopygium pygmaeum - Colombia, the Guianas
- Dicranopygium rheithrophilum - Colombia, Ecuador
- Dicranopygium robustum - Amazonas in Venezuela
- Dicranopygium rupestre - Venezuela
- Dicranopygium sanctae-martae - Colombia
- Dicranopygium sararense - Colombia
- Dicranopygium schultesii - Colombia, Ecuador
- Dicranopygium scoparum - Colombia
- Dicranopygium stenophyllum - Ecuador
- Dicranopygium tatica - Costa Rica
- Dicranopygium testaceum - Panama, Colombia
- Dicranopygium trianae - Colombia
- Dicranopygium umbrophilum - Nicaragua, Costa Rica, Panama
- Dicranopygium venezuelanum - Venezuela
- Dicranopygium wallisii - Costa Rica, Panama, Colombia
- Dicranopygium wedelii- Nicaragua, Costa Rica, Panama, Honduras
- Dicranopygium williamsii - Ecuador, Peru
- Dicranopygium yacu-sisa - Ecuador, Peru, Colombia, Venezuela

== Gallery ==
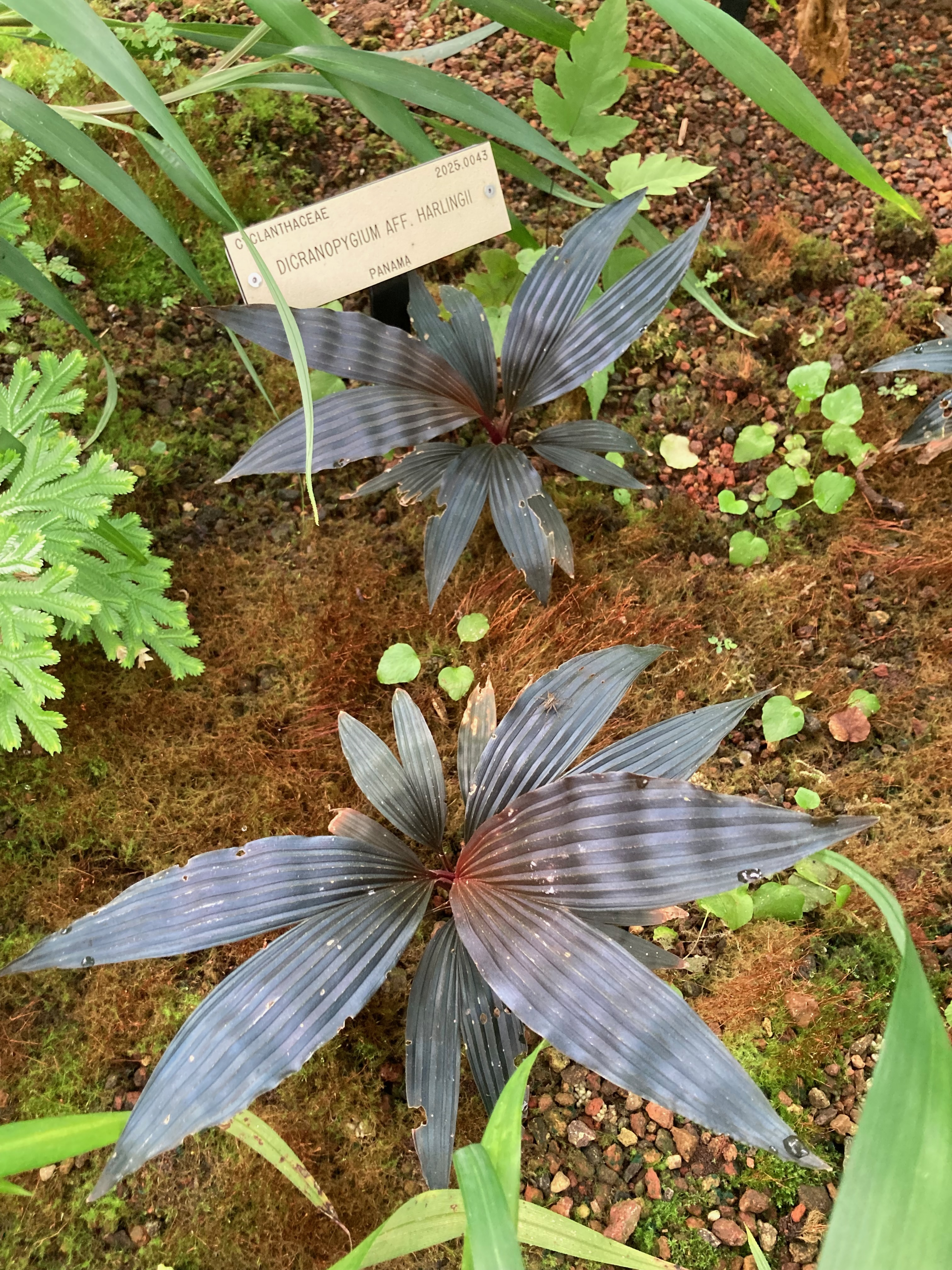
Dicranopygium aff. harlingii at UC Berkeley Botanical Garden.

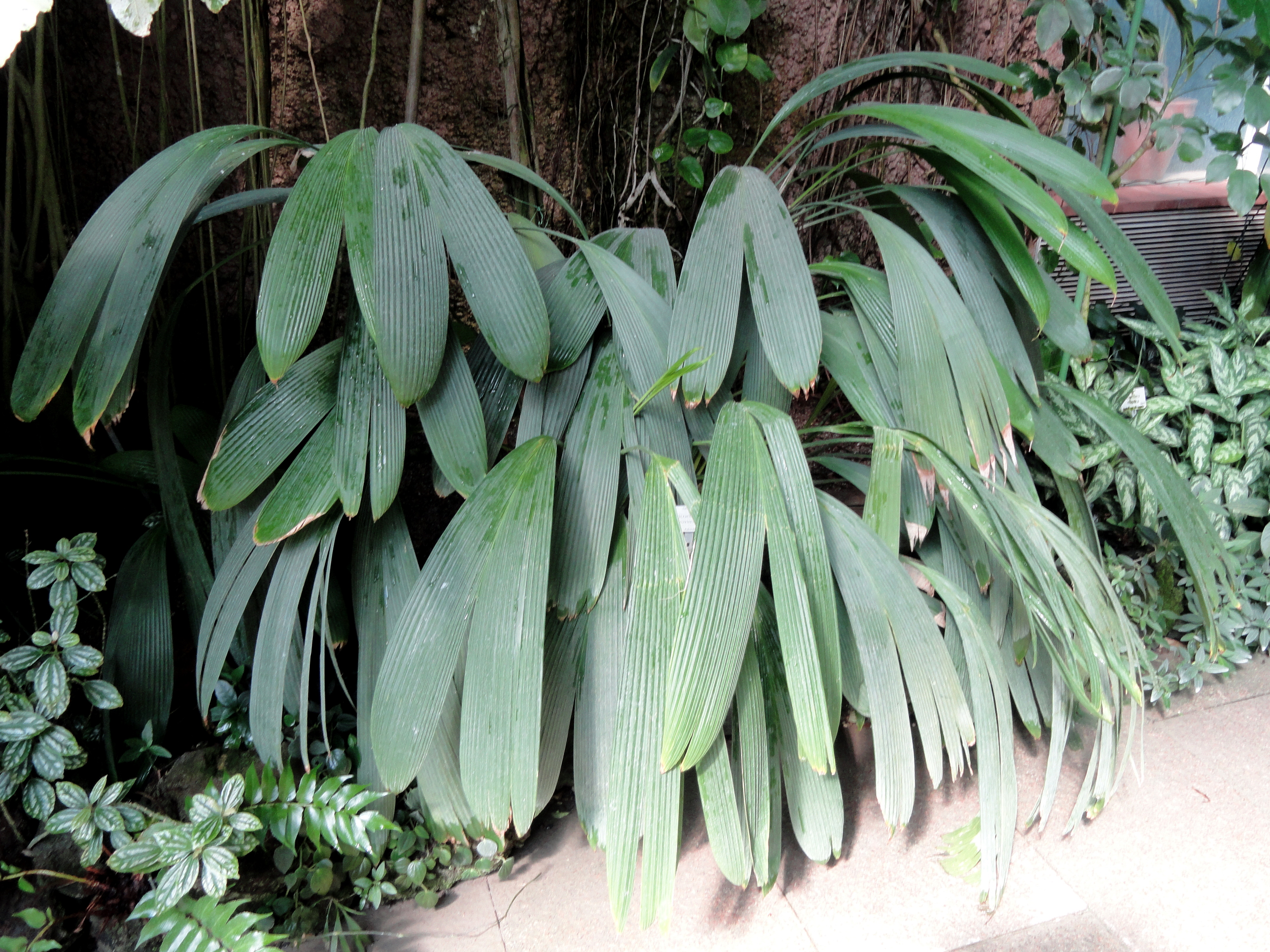
Dicranopygium atrovirens at Munich Botanical Garden.

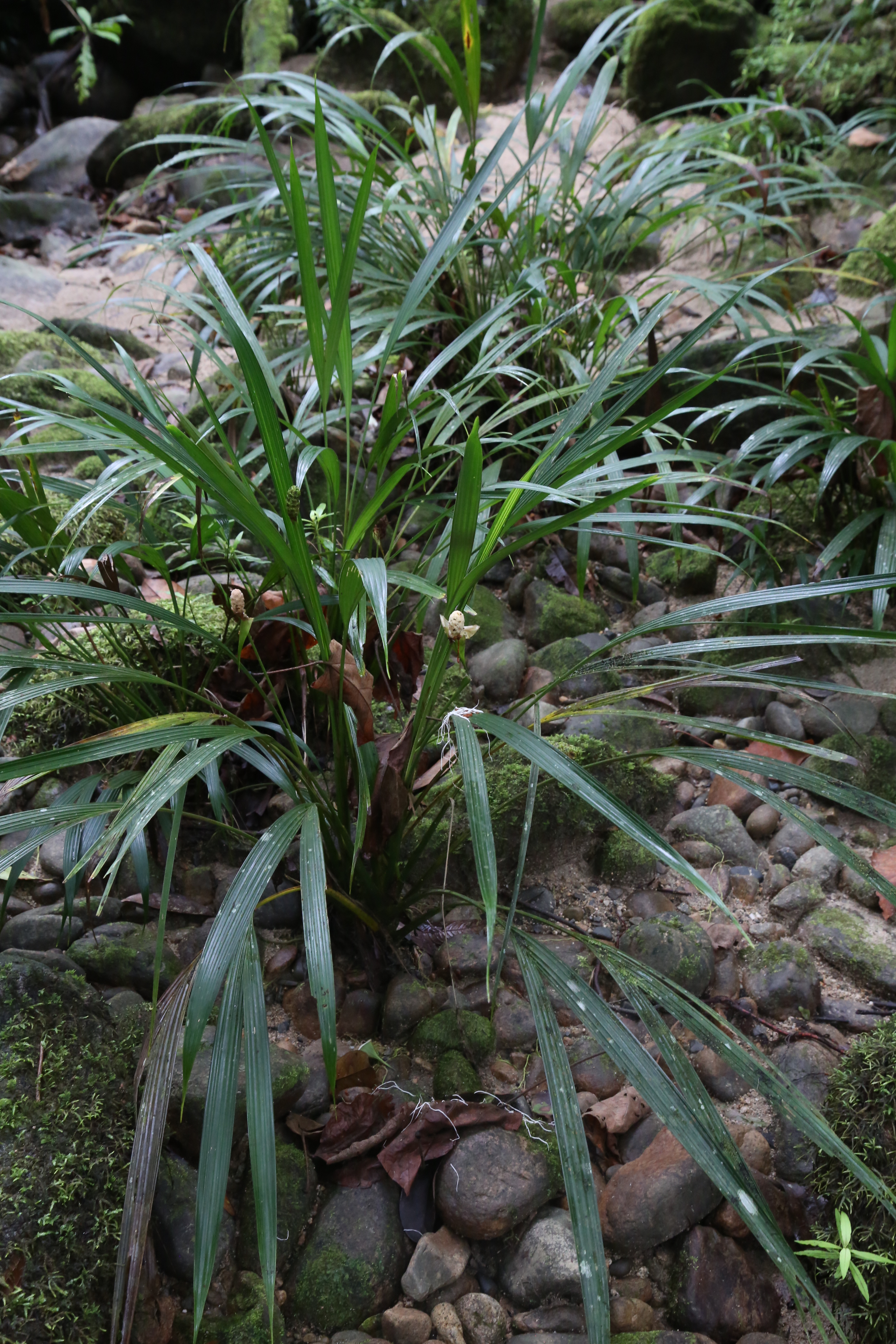
Dicranopygium stenophyllum.

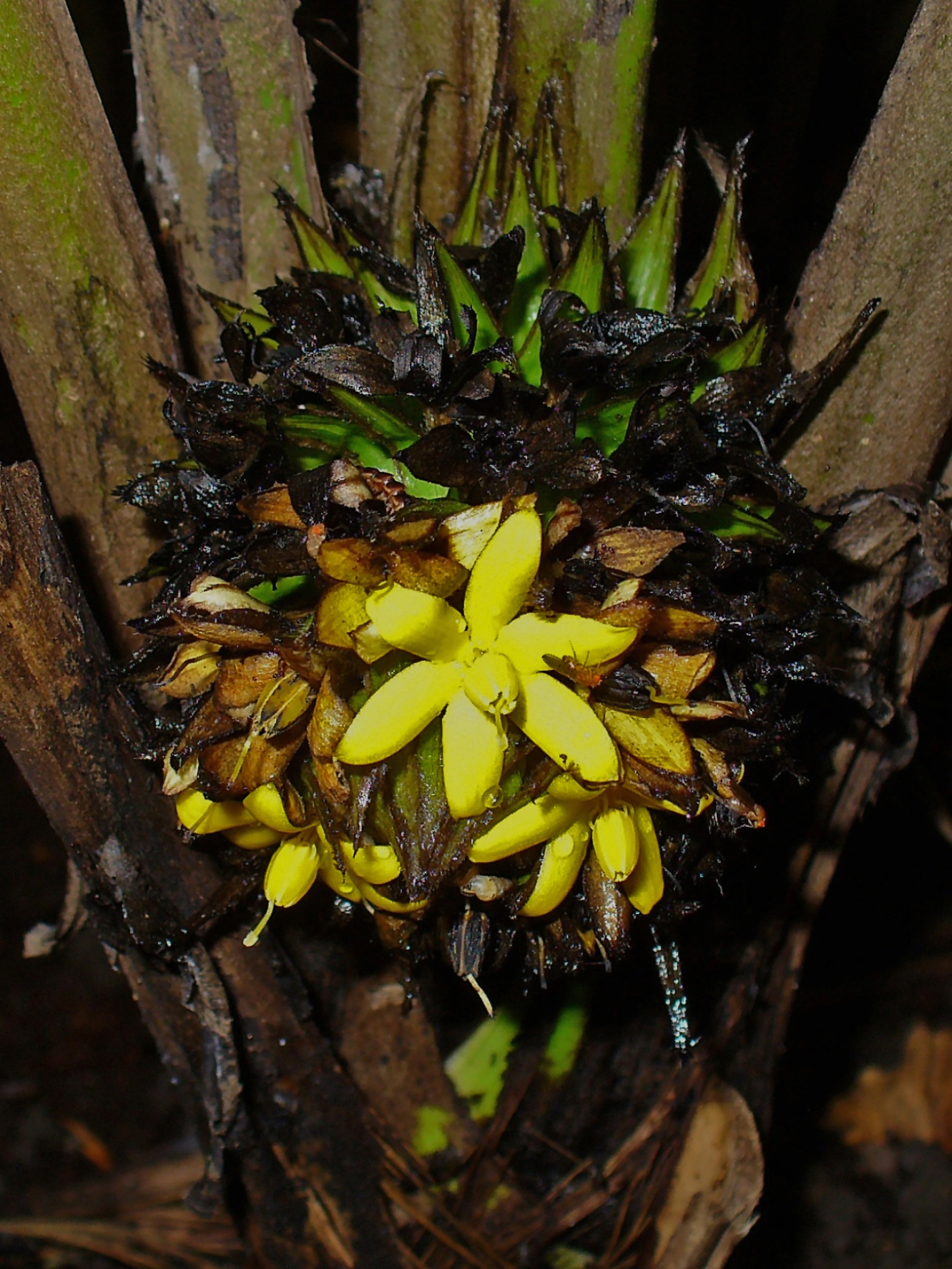
Dicranopygium microcephalum flower.
