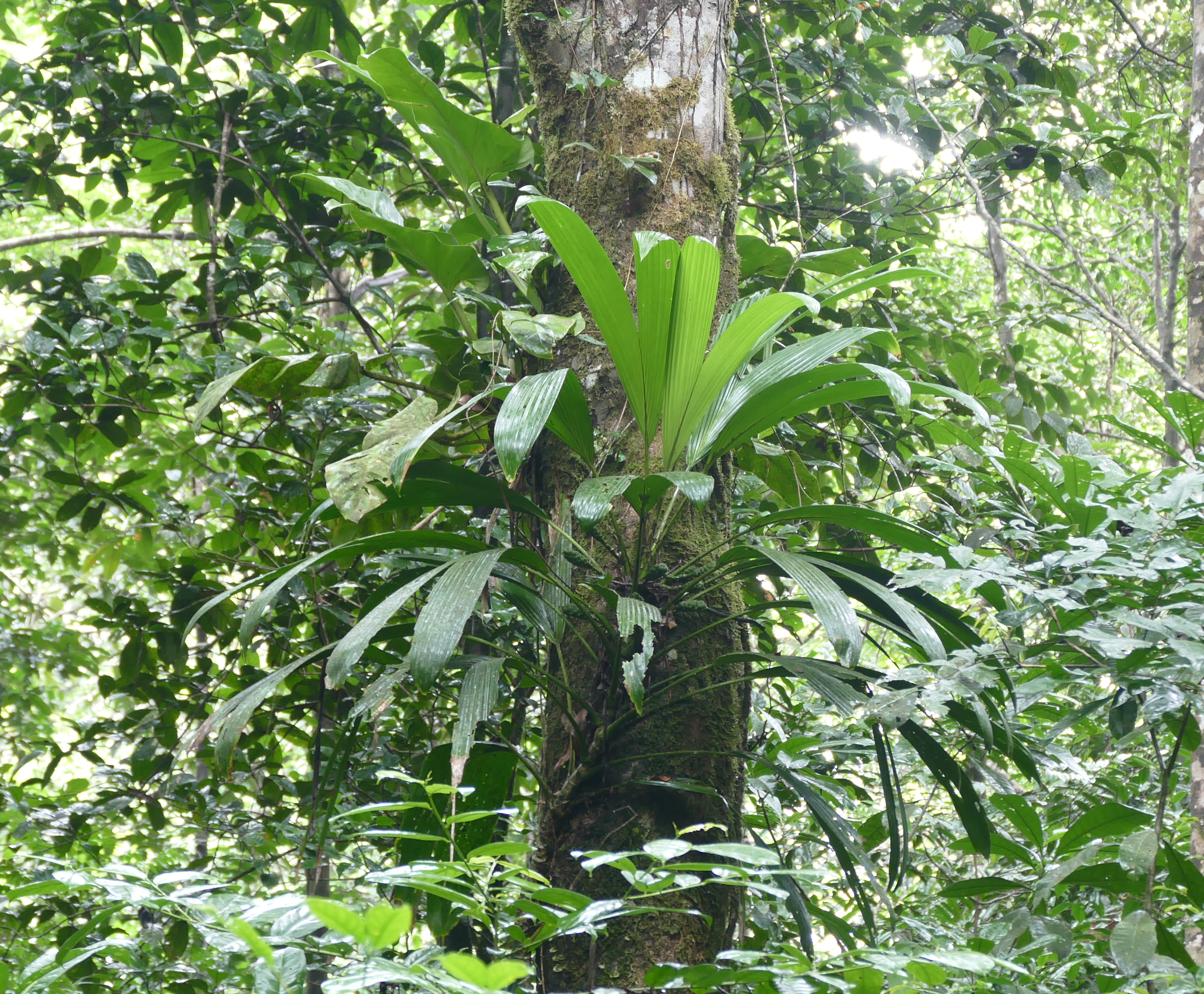

Scientific classification
- Kingdom: Plantae
- Clade: Embryophytes
- Clade: Tracheophytes
- Clade: Angiosperms
- Clade: Monocots
- Order: Pandanales
- Family: Cyclanthaceae
- Genus: Evodianthus; Oerst.
- Species: E. funifer

Binomial name
- Evodianthus funifer (Poit.) Lindm.

Synonyms
- Ludovia funifera Poit.; Salmia funifera (Poit.) Spreng.; Carludovica funifera (Poit.) Kunth; Ludovia subacaulis Poit.; Carludovica subacaulis (Poit.) Kunth; Evodianthus angustifolius Oerst.; Carludovica chelidonura Drude; Carludovica oerstedii Hemsl.; Evodianthus freyreissii Lindm.; Carludovica coronata Gleason

= Evodianthus =

Genus of flowering plants

Evodianthus is a genus of plants first described as a genus in 1857. It contains only one known species, Evodianthus funifer, native to Trinidad and Tobago, Central America (Costa Rica, Panama, Nicaragua) and northern South America (N Brazil, the Guianas, Venezuela, Colombia, Ecuador, Peru).

Subspecies

- Evodianthus funifer subsp. fendlerianus Harding - Aragua State in Venezuela
- Evodianthus funifer subsp. funifer - most of species range
- Evodianthus funifer subsp. peruvianus Harling - Colombia, Ecuador, Peru
- Evodianthus funifer subsp. trailianus (Drude) Harling - Guianas, Colombia, Peru, NW Brazil
