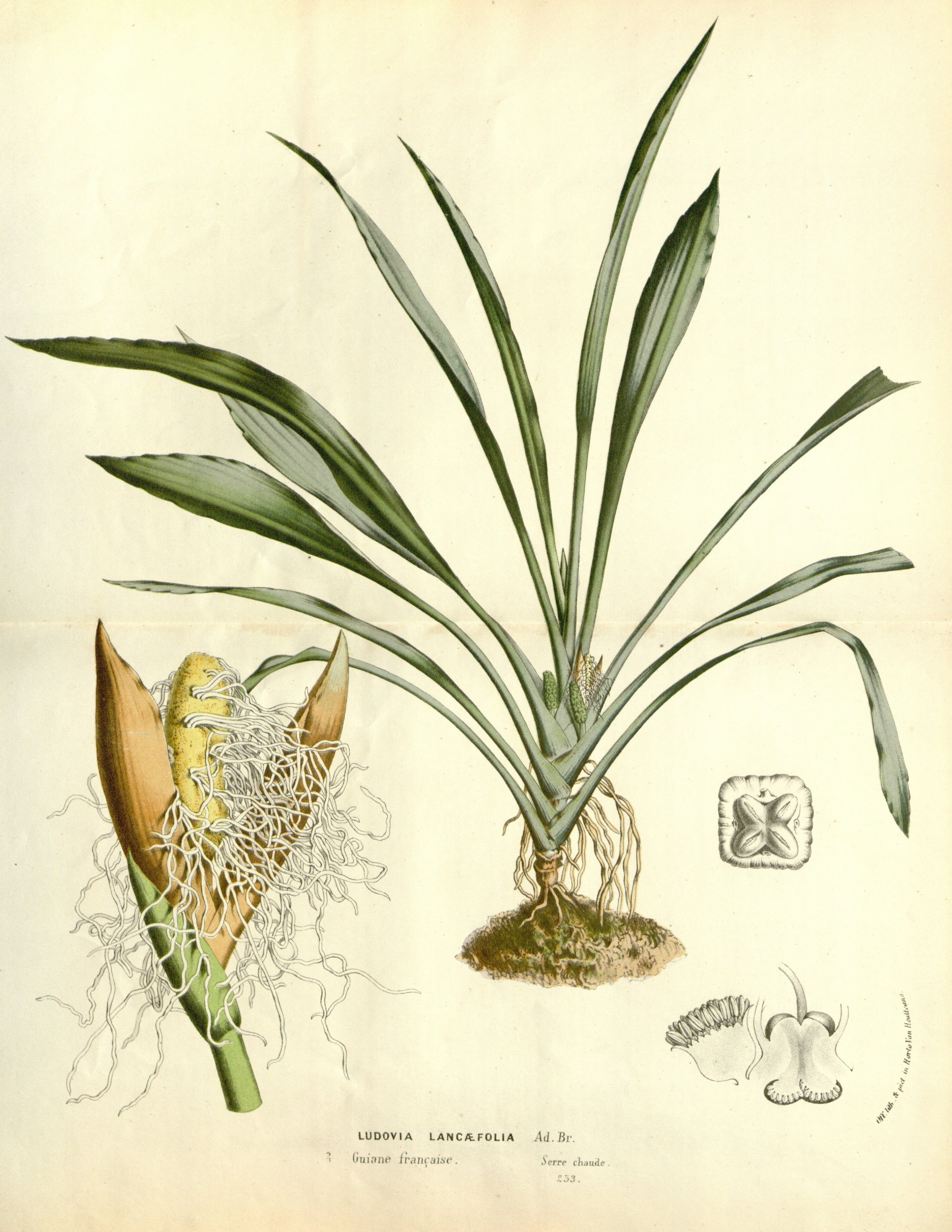
- Ludovia lancifolia

Scientific classification
- Kingdom: Plantae
- Clade: Tracheophytes
- Clade: Angiosperms
- Clade: Monocots
- Order: Pandanales
- Family: Cyclanthaceae
- Genus: Ludovia; Brongn. 1861, conserved name, not Pers. 1807

Type species
- Ludovia lancifolia Brongn.

= Ludovia =

Genus of flowering plants

Ludovia is a genus of plants first described as a genus in 1861. All the known species are native to Central and South America.

Species

- Ludovia bierhorstii Wilder - Colombia, Ecuador
- Ludovia integrifolia (Woodson) Harling - Nicaragua, Costa Rica, Panama, Colombia, Ecuador, Peru
- Ludovia lancifolia Brongn. - Panama, Colombia, Ecuador, Peru, Venezuela, the Guianas, NW Brazil
