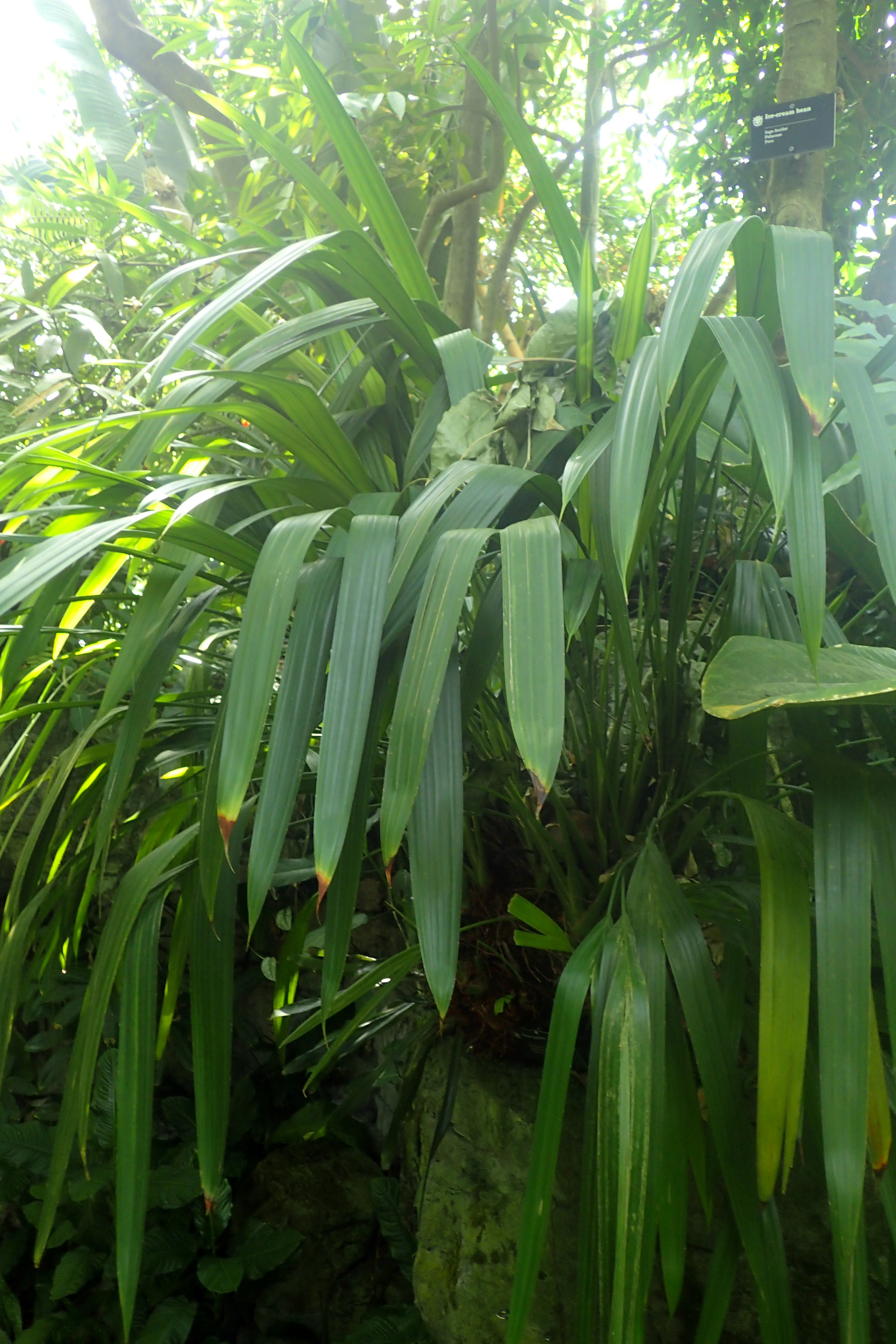
- Chorigyne ensiformis

Scientific classification
- Kingdom: Plantae
- Clade: Tracheophytes
- Clade: Angiosperms
- Clade: Monocots
- Order: Pandanales
- Family: Cyclanthaceae
- Genus: Chorigyne; R.Erikss.

Type species
- Chorigyne ensiformis (Hook.f.) R.Erikss.

= Chorigyne =

Genus of flowering plants

Chorigyne is a genus of plants first described as a genus in 1989. All the known species are native to Costa Rica and Panama.

Species

- Chorigyne cylindrica R.Erikss. - Costa Rica + Panama
- Chorigyne densiflora R.Erikss. - Panama
- Chorigyne ensiformis (Hook.f.) R.Erikss. - Costa Rica + Panama
- Chorigyne paucinervis R.Erikss. - Panama
- Chorigyne pendula (Hammel) R.Erikss. - Costa Rica + Panama
- Chorigyne pterophylla R.Erikss. - Costa Rica + Panama
- Chorigyne tumescens R.Erikss. - Panama
