= Thoracocarpus =

Thoracocarpus bissectus

Scientific classification
- Kingdom: Plantae
- Clade: Tracheophytes
- Clade: Angiosperms
- Clade: Monocots
- Order: Pandanales
- Family: Cyclanthaceae
- Genus: Thoracocarpus; Harling
- Species: T. bissectus

Binomial name
- Thoracocarpus bissectus (Vell.) Harling

Synonyms
- Dracontium bissectum Vell.; Philodendron bissectum (Vell.) Stellfeld; Carludovica kegeliana Lem.; Carludovica sarmentosa Sagot ex Drude; Carludovica mattogrossensis Lindm.; Carludovica bracteosa Gleason

Genus of flowering plants

Thoracocarpus is a genus of plants first described as a genus in 1958. It contains only one known species, Thoracocarpus bissectus a hemiepiphytic vine. It is native to Costa Rica, Panama, Cuba, Trinidad and Tobago, and South America (Colombia, Venezuela, the Guianas, Brazil, Bolivia, Peru, Ecuador).
