= Schultesiophytum =

Scientific classification
- Kingdom: Plantae
- Clade: Tracheophytes
- Clade: Angiosperms
- Clade: Monocots
- Order: Pandanales
- Family: Cyclanthaceae
- Genus: Schultesiophytum; Harling
- Species: S. chorianthum

Binomial name
- Schultesiophytum chorianthum Harling

Genus of flowering plants

Schultesiophytum is a genus of plants first described as a genus in 1958. It contains only one known species, Schultesiophytum chorianthum, native to Colombia, Peru, and Ecuador.
