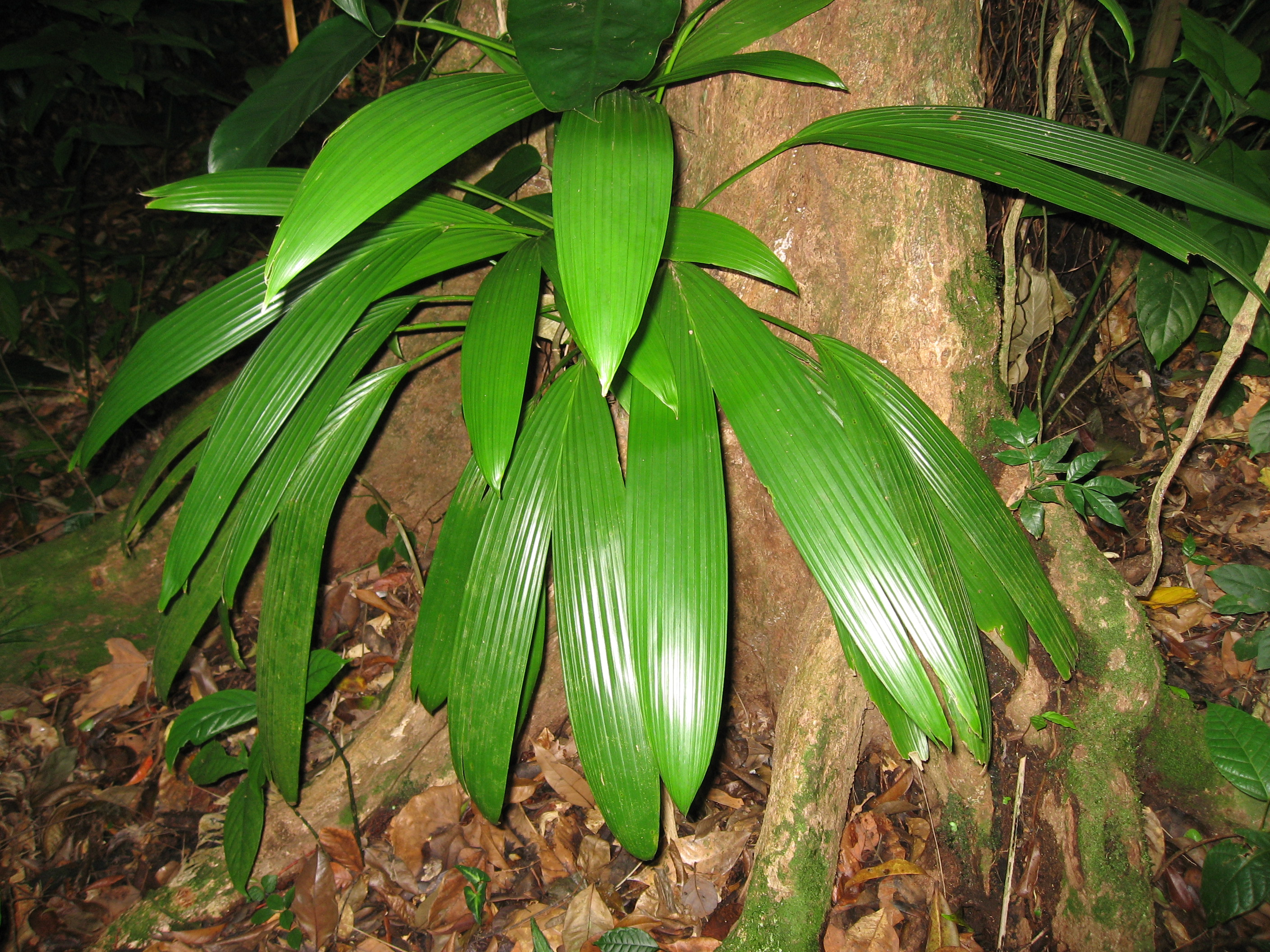
- Asplundia rigida

Scientific classification
- Kingdom: Plantae
- Clade: Tracheophytes
- Clade: Angiosperms
- Clade: Monocots
- Order: Pandanales
- Family: Cyclanthaceae
- Genus: Asplundia; Harling 1954

Synonyms
- Sarcinanthus Oerst., rejected name

= Asplundia =

Genus of flowering plants

Asplundia is a genus of plants belonging to the family Cyclanthaceae. They are distributed in the Neotropical realm from southern Mexico to southern Brazil.

Species

- Asplundia acuminata - Peru
- Asplundia ahlneri - Colombia
- Asplundia alata - from Costa Rica to Peru
- Asplundia albicarpa - from Costa Rica to Ecuador
- Asplundia allenii - Panama
- Asplundia altiscandens - NW Brazil
- Asplundia antioquiae - Colombia
- Asplundia aulacostigma - Ecuador
- Asplundia aurantiaca - from Nicaragua to Ecuador
- Asplundia brachyphylla - Guianas
- Asplundia brachypus - S Brazil
- Asplundia brasiliensis - Amazonas in Brazil
- Asplundia brunneistigma - Costa Rica, Panama
- Asplundia cabrerae - Colombia, Ecuador
- Asplundia caput-medusae - Venezuela
- Asplundia cayapensis - Ecuador
- Asplundia ceci Costa Rica, Colombia
- Asplundia clementinae - Ecuador
- Asplundia cupulifera - Colombia, Ecuador
- Asplundia cuspidata - Ecuador
- Asplundia cymbispatha - Bolivia
- Asplundia divergens - NW Brazil
- Asplundia domingensis - Ecuador
- Asplundia dussii - Lesser Antilles
- Asplundia ecuadoriensis - from Panama to Peru
- Asplundia euryspatha - Costa Rica, Panama
- Asplundia ewanii - Colombia, Ecuador
- Asplundia fagerlindii - Ecuador
- Asplundia fanshawei - Peru, Guyana, Suriname
- Asplundia fendleri - Venezuela
- Asplundia ferruginea - Costa Rica, Panama, Nicaragua
- Asplundia flavovaginata - from Costa Rica to NW Brazil
- Asplundia gamotepala - Colombia, Ecuador, Peru
- Asplundia gardneri - Brazil
- Asplundia gigantea - Colombia
- Asplundia glandulosa - Guianas
- Asplundia glaucophylla - Paraná
- Asplundia gleasonii - Guyana
- Asplundia goebelii - Tobago, Venezuela
- Asplundia guianensis - Guyana
- Asplundia harlingiana - Colombia
- Asplundia helicotricha - Ecuador
- Asplundia heteranthera Pará, Venezuela, Suriname, French Guiana
- Asplundia hookeri - Venezuela
- Asplundia humilis - Peru
- Asplundia insignis - Lesser Antilles
- Asplundia isabellina - Costa Rica, Panama, Ecuador
- Asplundia krukoffii - NW Brazil
- Asplundia labela - from Veracruz to Nicaragua
- Asplundia latifolia - Peru, French Guiana
- Asplundia latifrons - Amazonas in Brazil
- Asplundia liebmannii - from Veracruz to Nicaragua
- Asplundia lilacina - Ecuador
- Asplundia longicrura - NW Brazil
- Asplundia longistyla - Colombia
- Asplundia longitepala - Costa Rica, Panama, Colombia
- Asplundia luetzelburgii - Venezuela, NW Brazil
- Asplundia lutea - Ecuador
- Asplundia maguirei - Venezuela, Suriname, Guyana
- Asplundia maximiliani - Bahia
- Asplundia meraensis - Ecuador
- Asplundia microphylla - from Ecuador to Nicaragua
- Asplundia moritziana - Colombia, Venezuela, Brazil
- Asplundia multistaminata - Nicaragua, Costa Rica, Panama
- Asplundia neblinae - Venezuela, Brazil
- Asplundia nilssonii - Venezuela
- Asplundia nonoensis - Ecuador
- Asplundia pariensis - Venezuela
- Asplundia parviflora - Peru
- Asplundia pastazana Ecuador
- Asplundia peruviana - Colombia, Ecuador, Peru
- Asplundia pittieri - Costa Rica, Panama, Colombia
- Asplundia platanthera - Peru
- Asplundia platyphylla - Colombia
- Asplundia polymera - Brazil
- Asplundia ponderosa - Colombia, NW Brazil
- Asplundia pycnantha - Colombia, Ecuador
- Asplundia quinindensis - Ecuador
- Asplundia rhodea - Colombia
- Asplundia rigida - Trinidad, Dominican Republic, Lesser Antilles
- Asplundia rivularis - SE Brazil
- Asplundia sanctae-ritae - Costa Rica, Panama, Colombia
- Asplundia sarmentosa - Colombia
- Asplundia schizotepala - Ecuador, Peru, NW Brazil
- Asplundia sleeperae - Nicaragua, Costa Rica, Panama
- Asplundia sparrei - Ecuador
- Asplundia spectabilis - Venezuela
- Asplundia stenophylla - from Costa Rica to Ecuador
- Asplundia tetragona - Colombia
- †Asplundia tetragonopus - Brazil but extinct
- Asplundia trilobulata - Colombia
- Asplundia truncata - Ecuador
- Asplundia ulei - Peru
- Asplundia uncinata - Costa Rica, Panama
- Asplundia urophylla - Colombia
- Asplundia utilis - from Belize to Ecuador
- Asplundia vagans - from Guatemala to Bolivia
- Asplundia vaupesiana - Colombia, Venezuela, NW Brazil
- Asplundia venezuelensis - Venezuela
- Asplundia xiphophylla - Colombia, Venezuela, Peru NW Brazil
