= Dianthoveus =

Scientific classification
- Kingdom: Plantae
- Clade: Tracheophytes
- Clade: Angiosperms
- Clade: Monocots
- Order: Pandanales
- Family: Cyclanthaceae
- Genus: Dianthoveus; Hammel & G.J.Wilder
- Species: D. cremnophilus

Binomial name
- Dianthoveus cremnophilus Hammel & G.J.Wilder

Genus of flowering plants

Dianthoveus is a genus of plants first described as a genus in 1989. It contains only one known species, Dianthoveus cremnophilus, native to Colombia and Ecuador in South America.
