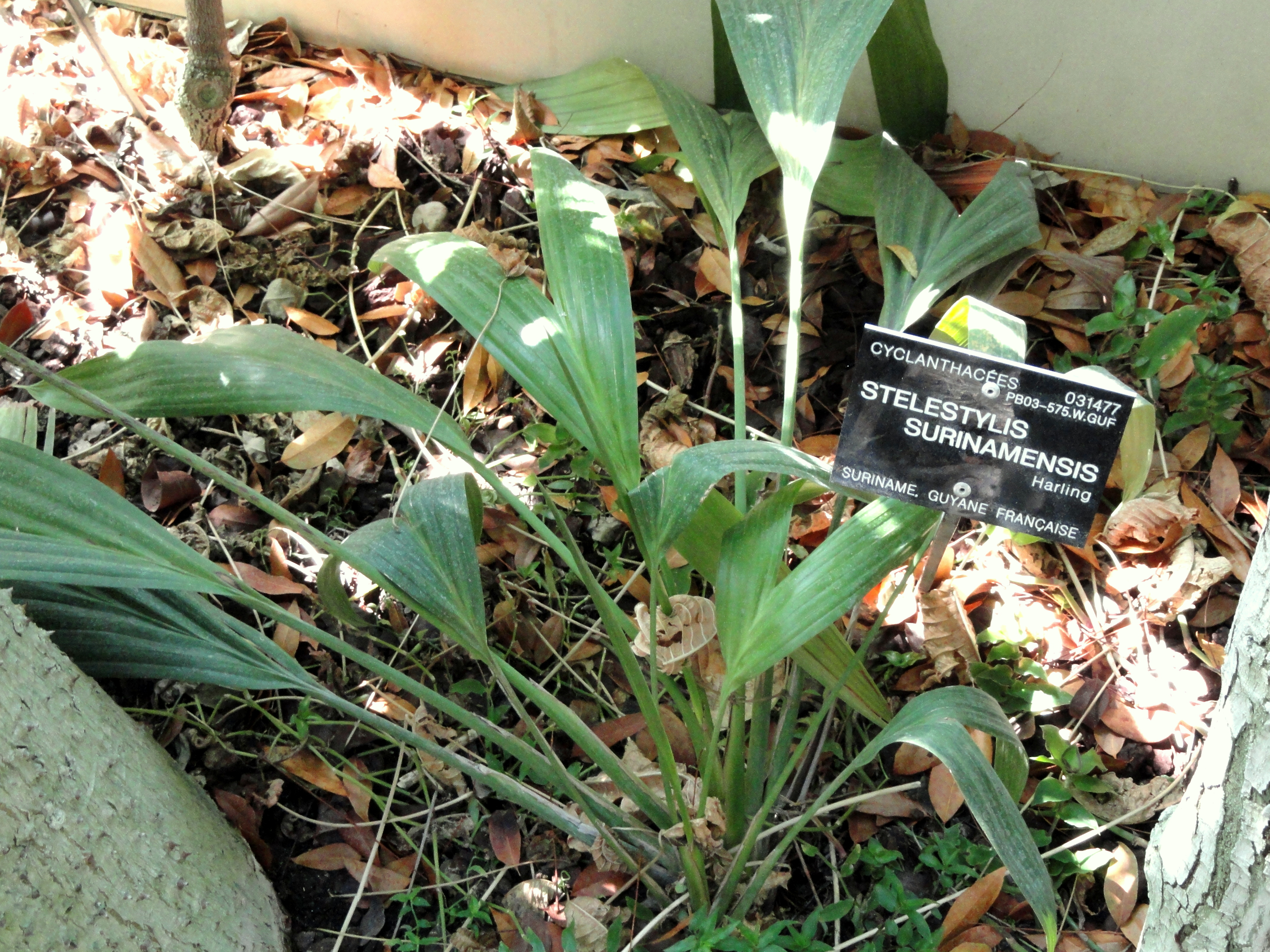
- Stelestylis surinamensis

Scientific classification
- Kingdom: Plantae
- Clade: Embryophytes
- Clade: Tracheophytes
- Clade: Spermatophytes
- Clade: Angiosperms
- Clade: Monocots
- Order: Pandanales
- Family: Cyclanthaceae
- Genus: Stelestylis; Drude

Type species
- Stelestylis coriacea Drude

= Stelestylis =

Genus of flowering plants

Stelestylis is a genus of plants first described as a genus in 1881. All the known species are native to northern South America (Venezuela and the Guianas).

Species

- Stelestylis anomala Harling - Aragua + Carabobo States in Venezuela
- Stelestylis coriacea Drude - probably Brazil; original type destroyed in Second World War, precise location locale unknown
- Stelestylis stylaris (Gleason) Harling - Venezuela, Guyana
- Stelestylis surinamensis Harling - Suriname, French Guiana
