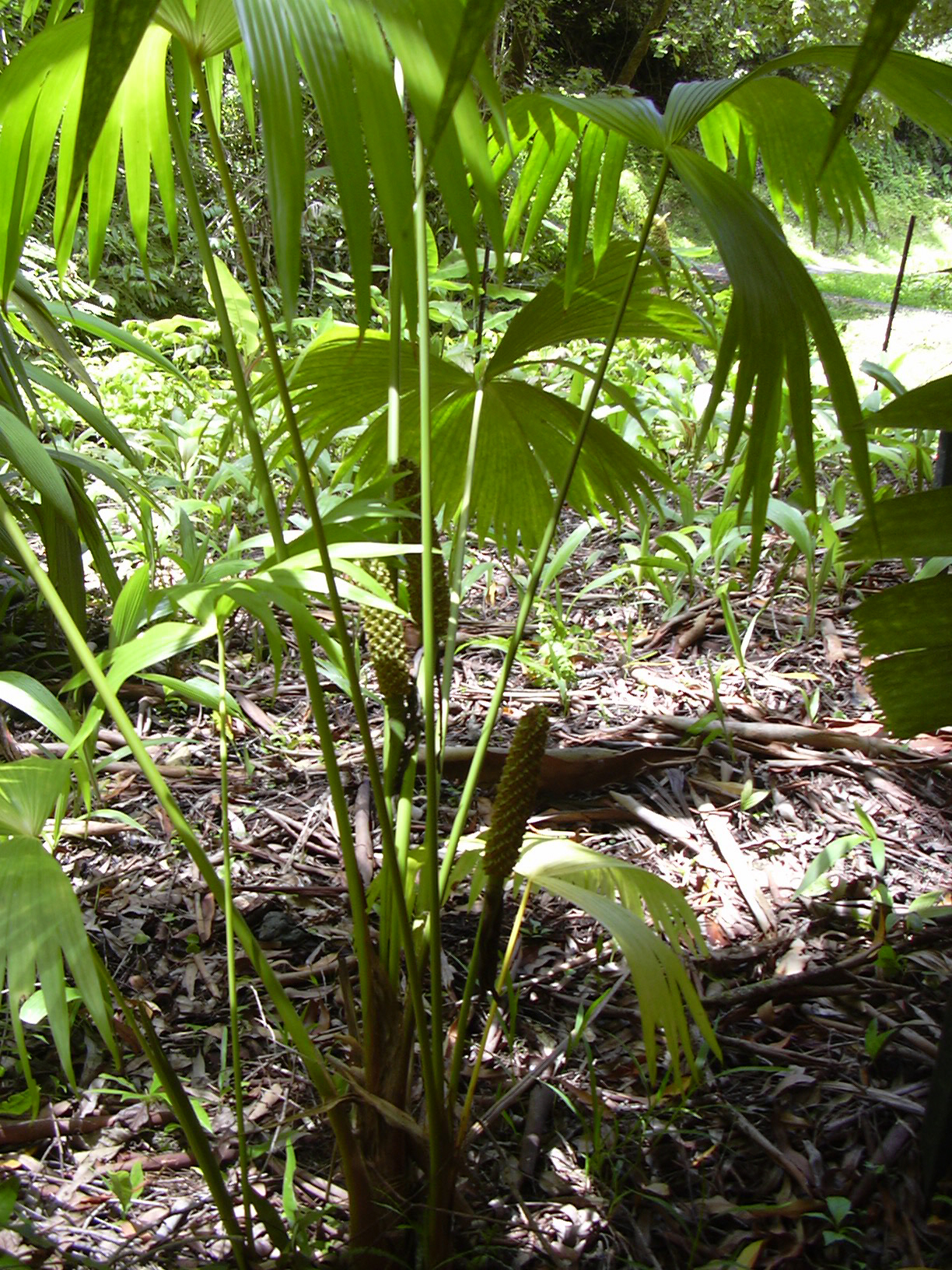

Conservation status
- Least Concern (IUCN 3.1)

Scientific classification
- Kingdom: Plantae
- Clade: Tracheophytes
- Clade: Angiosperms
- Clade: Monocots
- Order: Pandanales
- Family: Cyclanthaceae
- Genus: Carludovica
- Species: C. palmata

Binomial name
- Carludovica palmata Ruiz & Pav.

Synonyms
- Ludovia palmata (Ruiz & Pav.) Pers.; Salmia palmata (Ruiz & Pav.) Willd.; Salmia incisa (H.Wendl.) Bosse; Carludovica gigantea Kuntze; Carludovica humilis (Wawra & Bermann) Kuntze; Carludovica incisa H.Wendl.; Carludovica incisa var. wendlandii Wawra & Bermann; Carludovica jamaicensis Lodd. ex Fawcett & Harris; Carludovica palmata var. humilis Wawra & Bermann; Carludovica serrata Wawra & Bermann; Salmia jamaicensis Steud.

= Carludovica palmata =

Species of flowering plant

Carludovica palmata (also known as Panama hat plant, toquilla palm, calá, palmilla, palmero, pojom, jiraca, junco, soyacal, tepejilote, and jipijapa) is a species of flowering plant in the family Cyclanthaceae. It is not a true palm, but its leaves are similar to the leaves of some true palms, such as Chelyocarpus ulei. Unlike several true palms, C. palmata does not develop a woody trunk. Its female flowers (which mature first) have large stigmas, and its male flowers (which mature later) have a lot of pollen.

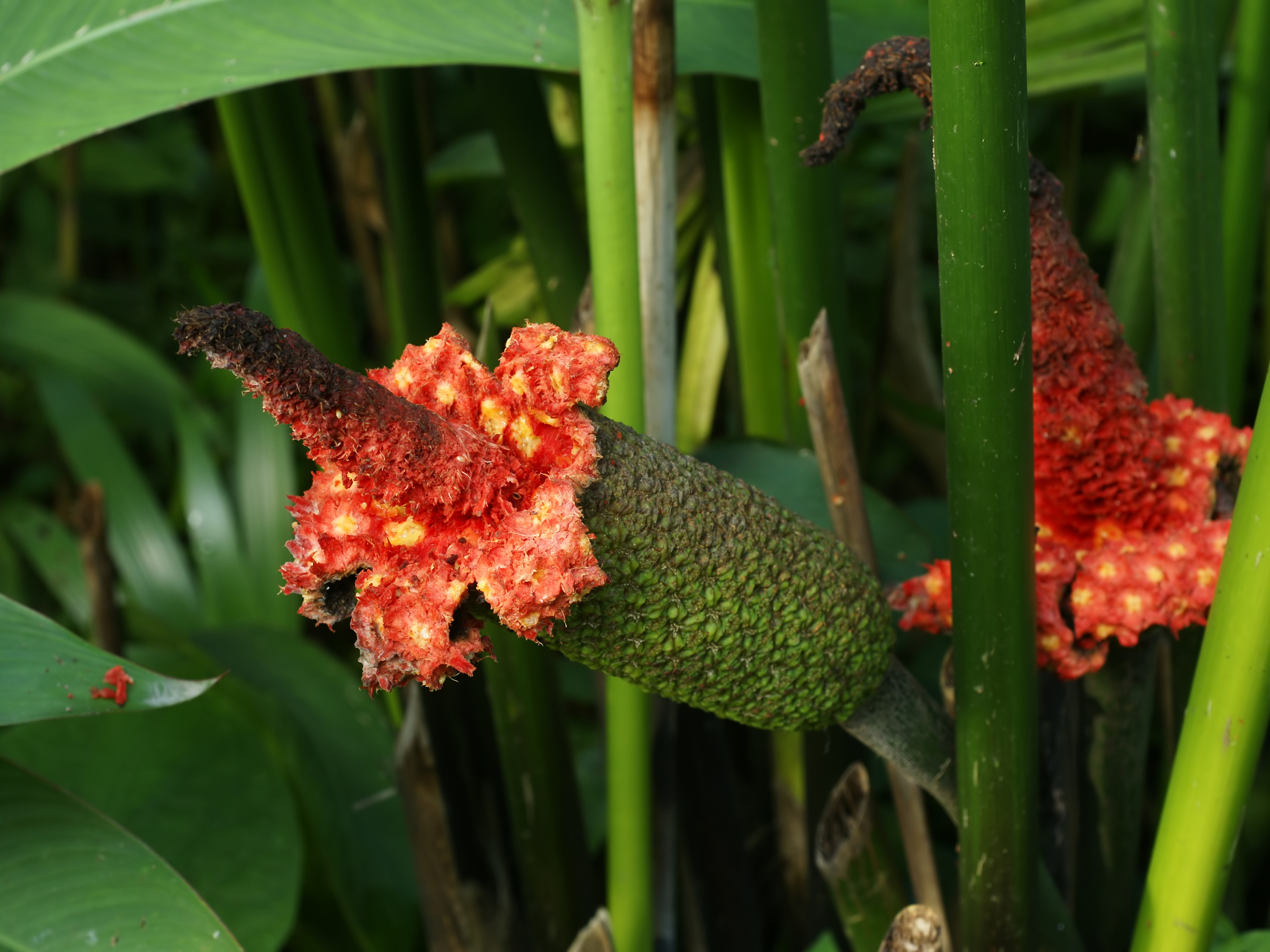
Fruit

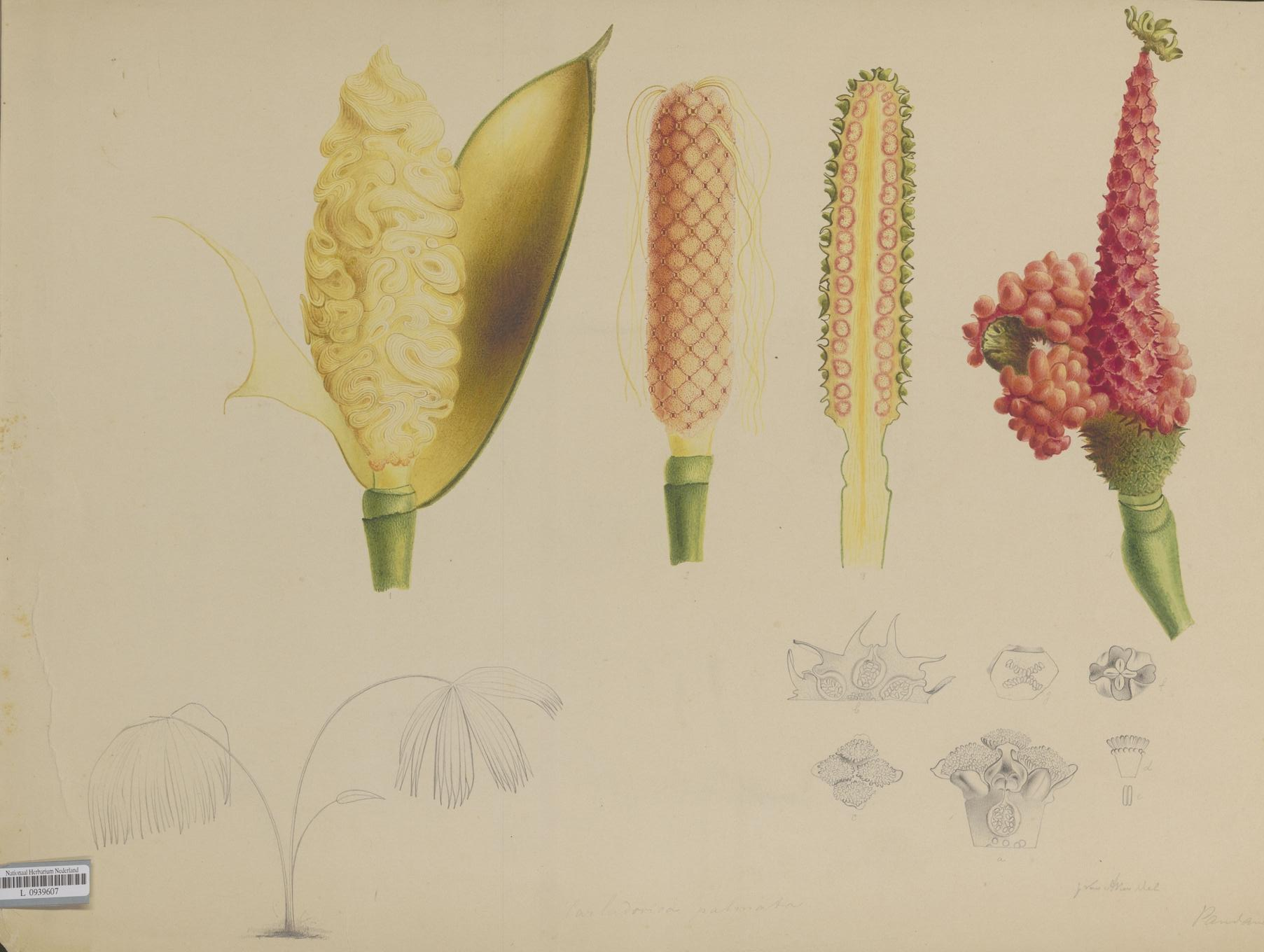
Carludovica palmata by J. van Aken, 1860-1870

== Uses and cultivation ==
The Panama hat palm is cultivated from Central America to Bolivia. Its soft, flexible, and durable fibers are used to weave Panama hats and other items. Its leaf shoots are consumed in Central America.
