= Gunnar Harling =

Swedish botanist

Gunnar Wilhelm Harling (7 June 1920, in Stockholm – 24 May 2010) was a Swedish botanist.

Harling earned his doctorate at the Stockholm University in 1951, was an assistant at the Bergius Botanic Garden from 1950 to 1952 and associate professor of botany at the Stockholm University 1951–1963. From 1964 he was Professor and Chair of Systematic Botany at the University of Gothenburg, and in 1974 became a member of the Academy of Sciences.
