= Panama hat =

Traditional brimmed straw hat of Ecuadorian origin

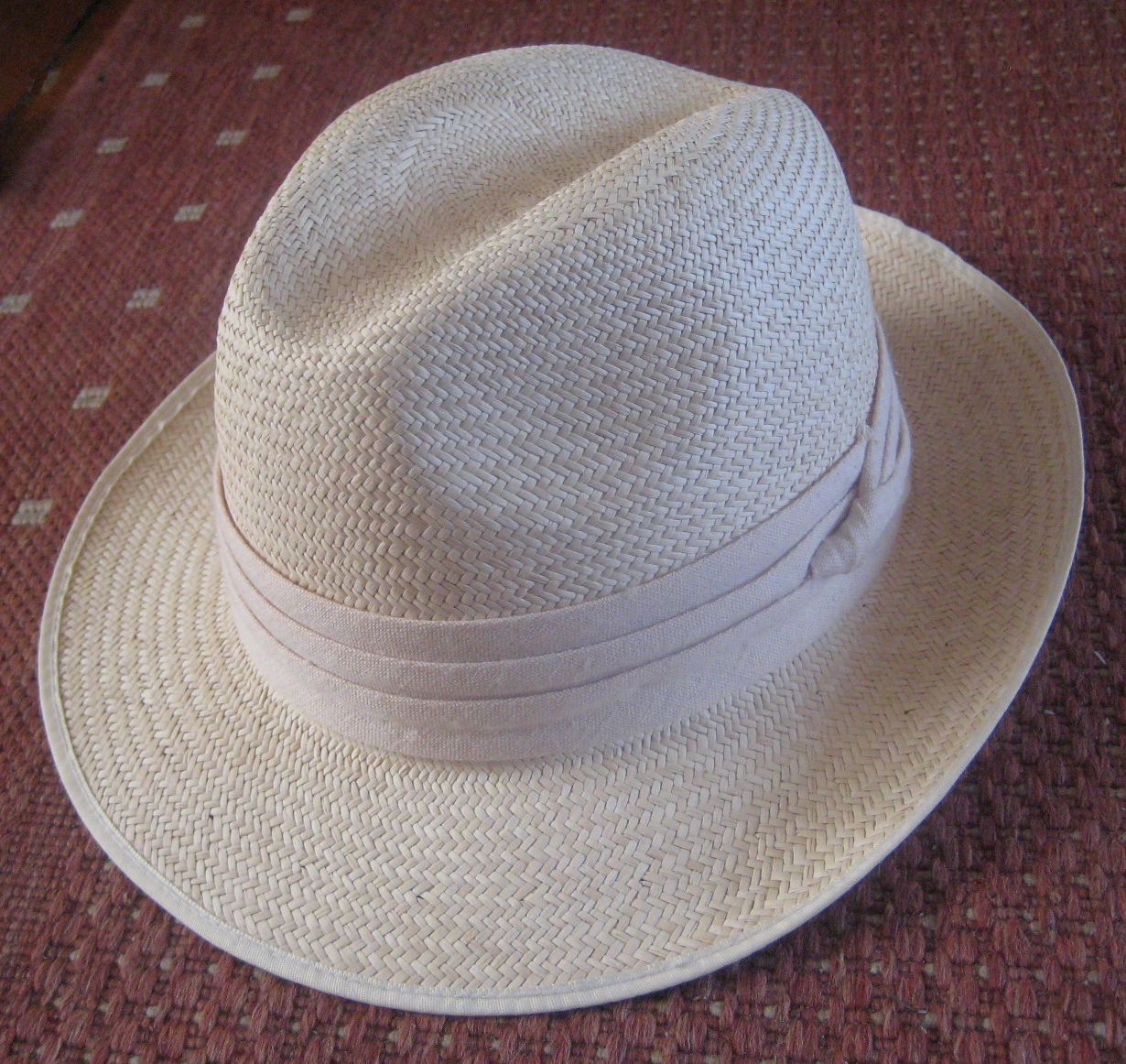
- An Ecuadorian hat
- Type: Hat
- Material: Straw
- Place of origin: Ecuador

Traditional weaving of the Ecuadoran toquilla straw hat
- UNESCO Intangible Cultural Heritage
- Country: Ecuador
- Reference: 00729
- Region: Latin America and the Caribbean

Inscription history
- Inscription: 2012 (7th session)
- List: Representative

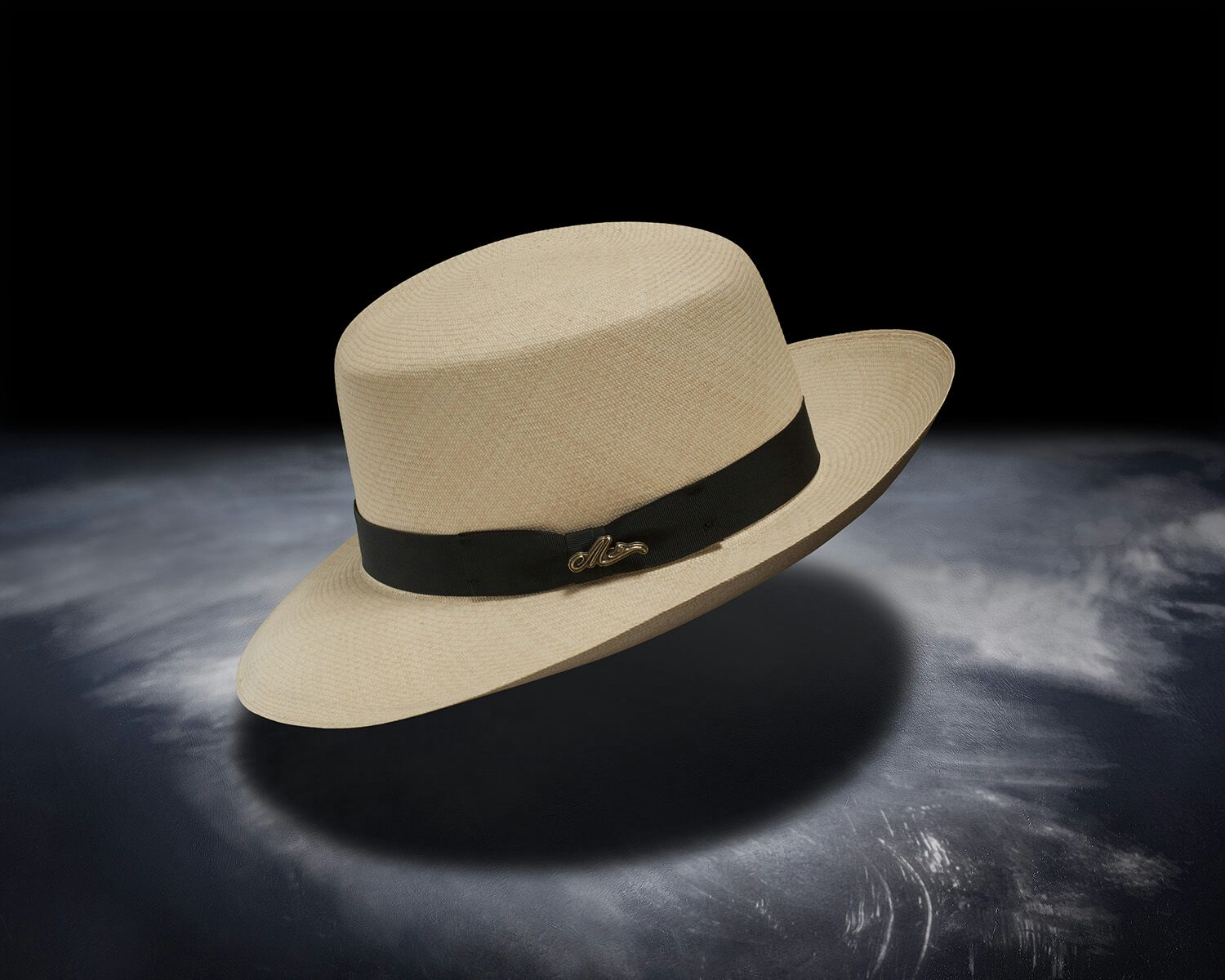
Montecristi Ecuadoran hat

A Panama hat, also known as an Ecuadorian hat, a Jipijapa hat, or a toquilla straw hat, is a traditional brimmed straw hat of Ecuadorian origin. Traditionally, hats were made from the plaited leaves of the Carludovica palmata plant, known locally as the toquilla palm or Jipijapa palm, although it is a palm-like plant rather than a true palm.

Ecuadoran hats are light-colored, lightweight, and breathable, and often worn as accessories to summer-weight suits, such as those made of linen or silk. The tightness, the fineness of the weave, and the time spent in weaving a complete hat out of the toquilla straw characterize its quality. Beginning around the turn of the 20th century, these hats became popular as tropical and seaside accessories owing to their ease of wear and breathability.

The art of weaving the traditional Ecuadoran toquilla hat was added to the UNESCO Intangible Cultural Heritage Lists on 5 December 2012.

== History ==
Although commonly called "Panama hat" in English, the hat has its origin in Ecuador. When the Spanish conquistadors arrived in Ecuador in 1526, the inhabitants of its coastal areas were observed to wear a brimless hat that resembled a toque, which was woven from the fibres from a palm tree that the Spaniards came to call paja toquilla or "toquilla straw". By the mid 1600s, hat weaving evolved as a cottage industry along the Ecuadorian coast as well as in small towns throughout the Andean mountain range. Hat weaving and wearing grew steadily in Ecuador through the 17th and 18th centuries.

One of the first towns to start weaving the hats in the Andes is Principal, part of the Chordeleg Canton in the Azuay province. Straw hats woven in Ecuador, like many other 19th- and early 20th-century South American goods, were shipped first to the Isthmus of Panama before sailing for their destinations in Asia, the rest of the Americas and Europe, subsequently acquiring a name that reflected their point of international sale—"Panama hats"—rather than their place of domestic origin.

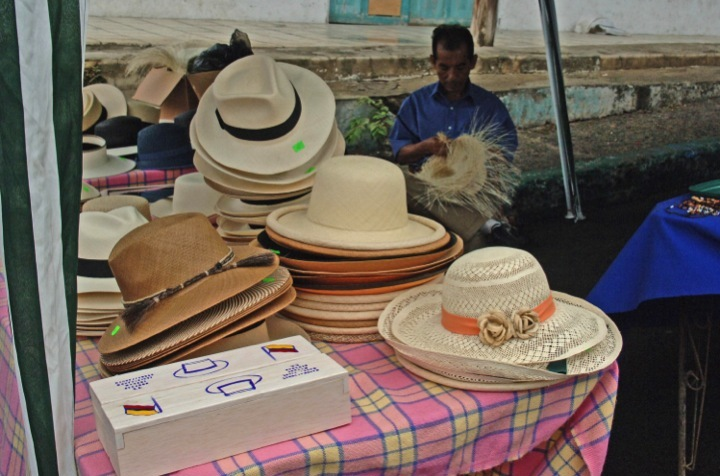
Hat stand in Montecristi, Ecuador.

Usage of the term Panama hat can be found in publications by 1828. In 1835, Manuel Alfaro arrived in Montecristi to make his name and fortune in Panama hats. He set up a Panama hat business with his main objective being exportation. Cargo ships from Guayaquil and Manta were filled with his merchandise and headed to the Gulf of Panama. His business prospered with the onset of the California gold rush in the mid-19th century, as prospectors who took a sea-route to California had to travel overland at the Isthmus of Panama and needed a hat for the sun, and export of woven straw hats from Ecuador/Panama to the United States also increased to 220,000 per year by 1850.

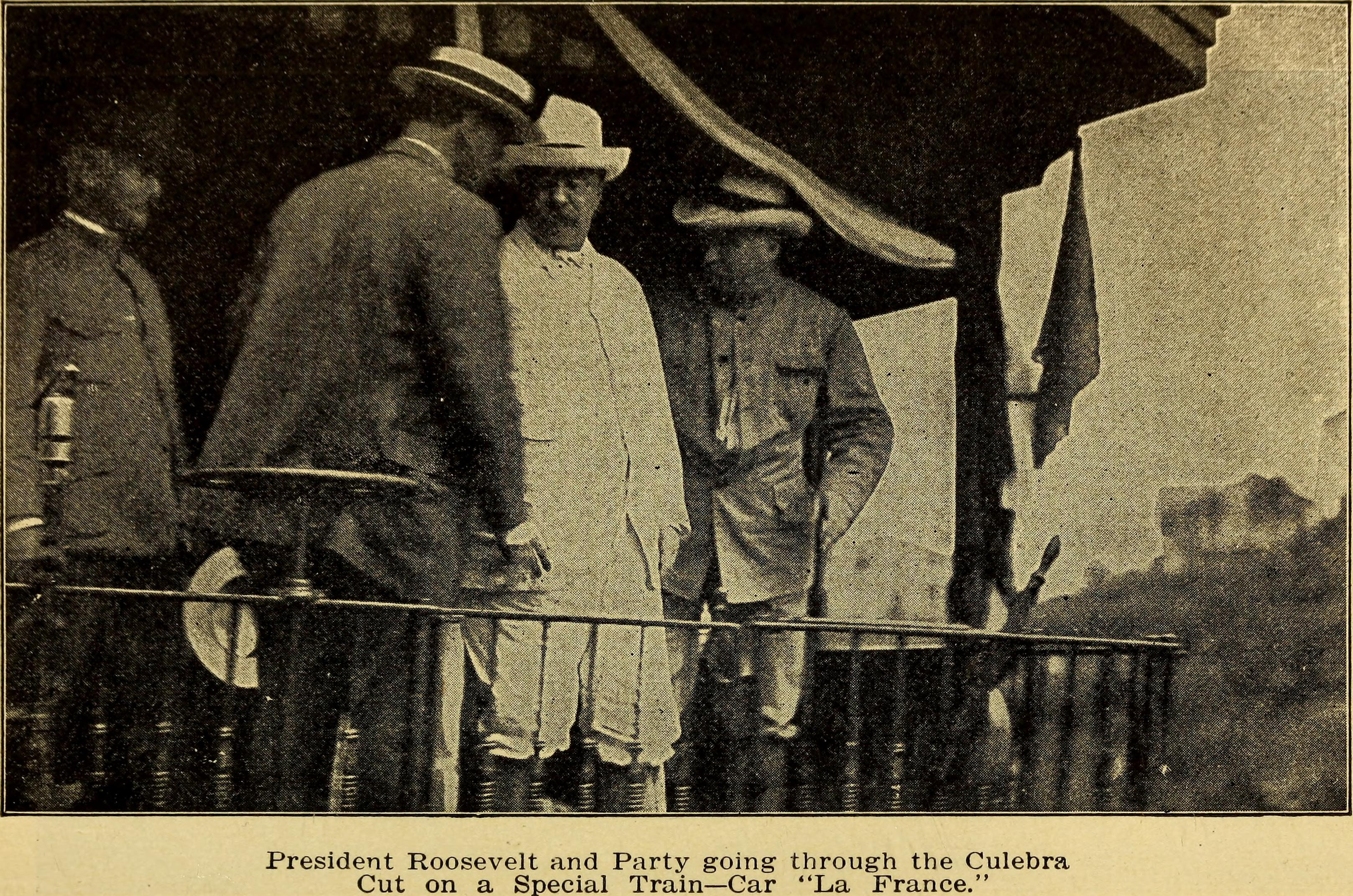
U.S. President Theodore Roosevelt wearing a Panama hat during his visit to the Panama Canal.

In 1906, U.S. President Theodore Roosevelt visited the construction site of the Panama Canal and was photographed wearing a Panama hat, which further increased the hat's popularity.

In the 1920s and 1930s, shifting public preferences towards lighter, more durable hats helped the fedora-like Panama eclipse the strawboater as the summer hat of choice.

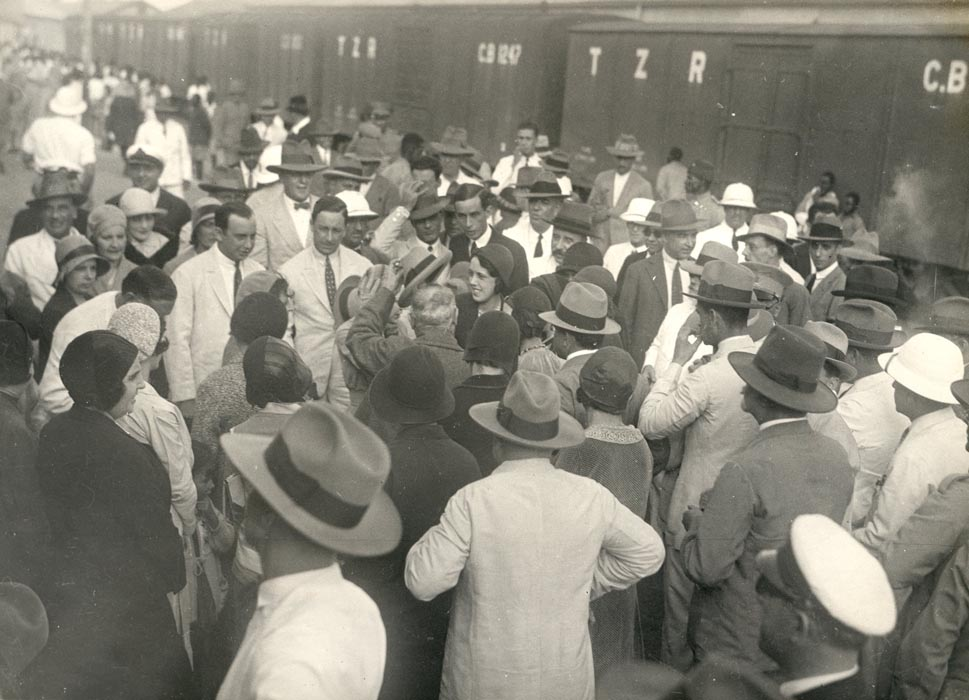
Portuguese men wearing panama hats in the 1930s.

Although the Panama hat continues to provide a livelihood for thousands of Ecuadorians, fewer than a dozen weavers capable of making the "Montecristi superfinos" remain. Ecuadorian companies like K. Dorfzaun and Andes Munay have specialized in exporting genuine Panama hats and supplying designer and retail brands with quality accessories made by hand. These companies help communities sustain their traditions and intangible cultural heritage. Even though Chinese companies have been producing Panama hats at a cheaper price, the quality of the product cannot be compared with the Ecuadorian toquilla palm hats.

Many people wear light-colored Ecuadorian hats with linen or silk summer clothes in the summer. A toquilla straw hat is exceptional because of its tight weave, delicate construction, and lengthy manufacturing process. These hats were commonplace in tropical and coastal settings around the turn of the century because of their lightweight design and ability to keep the wearer cool.

=== Tamsui hat ===
The tamsui hat was a straw hat made in Formosa (now Taiwan) to directly compete with the Panama in the early 20th century. Tamsui hats were made from Pandanus odoratissimus fibre, which grew plentifully on the island. As they retained their whiteness, were washable, and could be folded and carried about without damage, Tamsui hats replaced the rather costlier Panama in East Asia in the early 20th century.

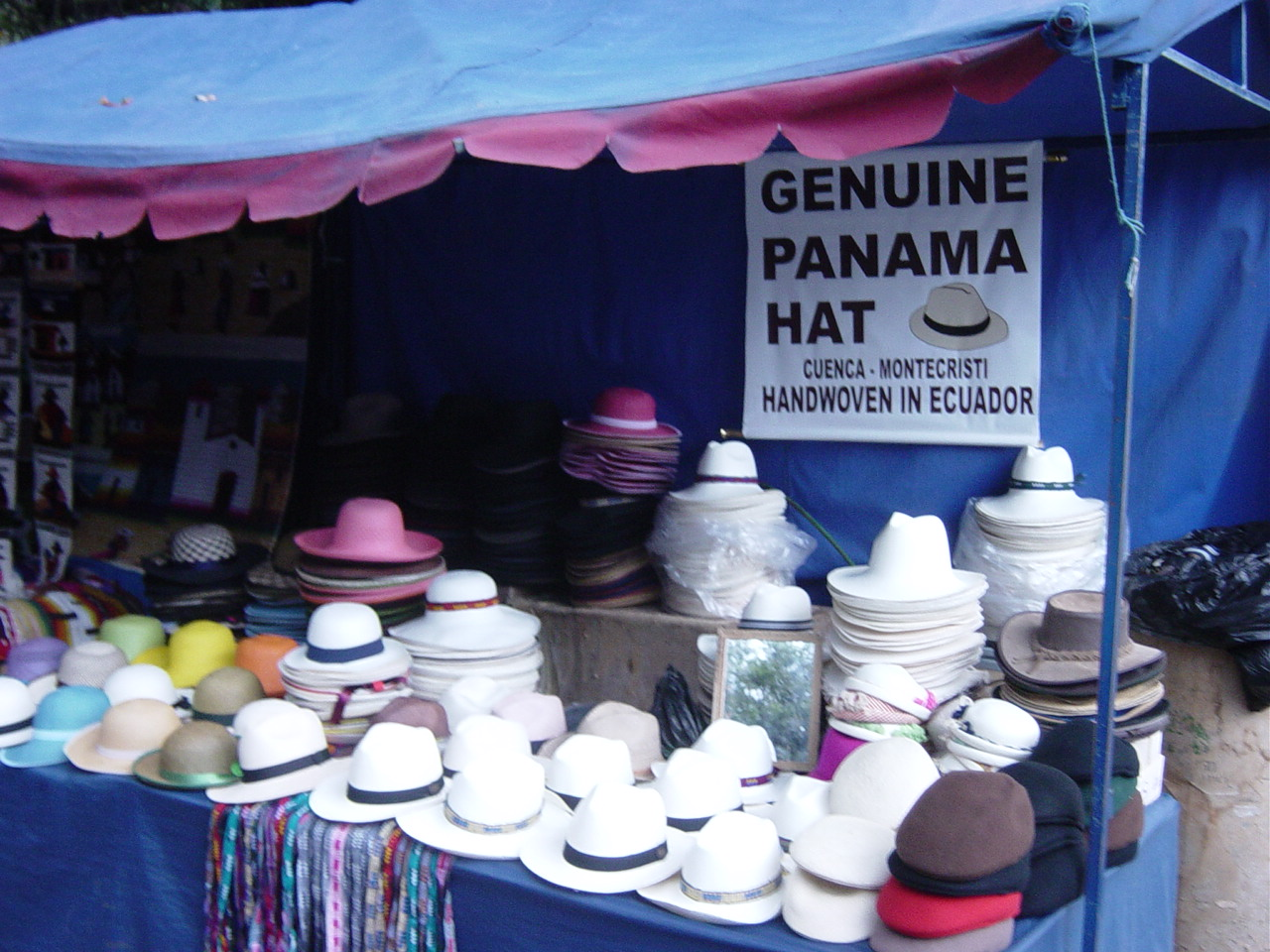
Panama hats sold at a street market in Ecuador

== Construction ==
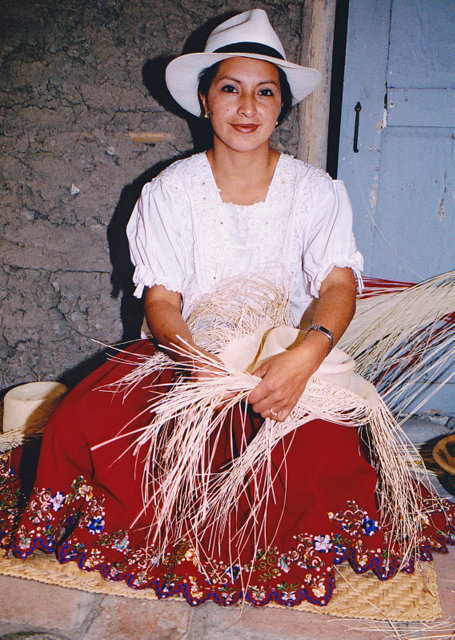
Hatter at work, Ecuador

The two main processes in the creation of a Panama hat are weaving and blocking. The two most common types of weaves are the cuenca and brisa. The cuenca weave has the appearance of a herringbone pattern and utilizes slightly more straw than the brisa weave. The brisa weave has the appearance of small diamonds/squares. This type of weave is less intricate but perceived as finer than the cuenca weave by some as it is lighter. Other types of weaves include the crochet, fancy, torcido, and new order.

The quality of a Panama hat is defined by the tightness of the weave. The fine weave of the hat was ideal for protection against the tropical sun. Historically, to measure the tightness of the weave, a simple square tool that looks like a picture frame was used. The aperture of this frame was 25 mm, or about 1 inch. The regulator would set this frame one inch from the edge of the hat's brim edge, and then count the peaks of the cross weaves, called carerra, moving in a parallel direction. The tighter the weave, the more carerras were counted. That number would be multiplied by two and reconciled against a grading chart. A highly refined grade 20 would consist of 16 carerras.

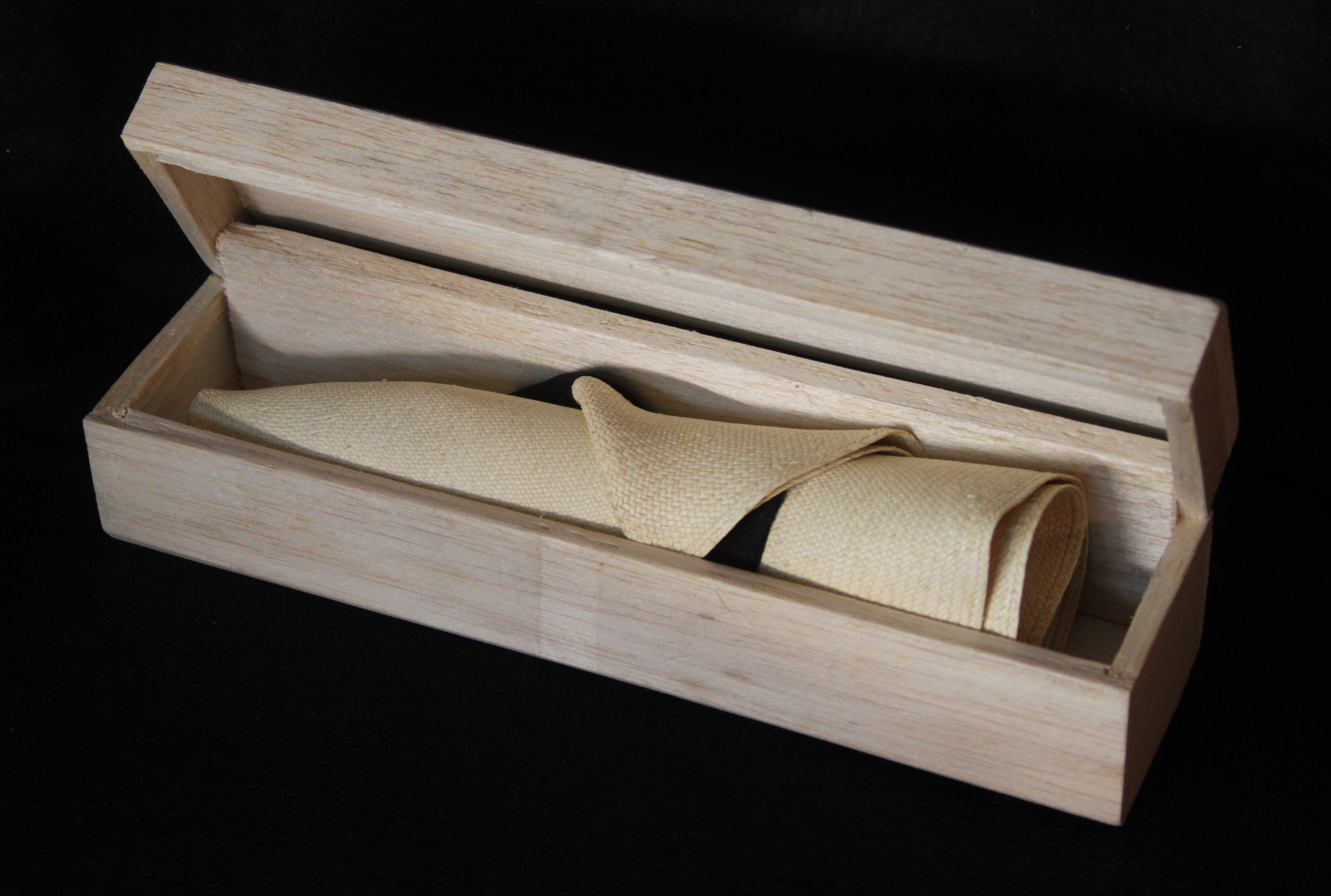
A Montecristi Panama hat rolled up in a box

The price of these hats depends on the time and quality that a weaver put in to the hat. A master weaver could take as long as eight months to weave a single hat. Weavers could sell a single hat to buyers for US$200. Once the hat is sold to a buyer it then would pass through more people who would "finish the brim, shape it, remove imperfections, bleach the straw, and add interior and exterior brands." After this one hat has been through at least six people it can then be sold outside of Ecuador for $450 to $10,000. The best hats can sell for up to fifty times more than one weaver is paid for eight months of work.

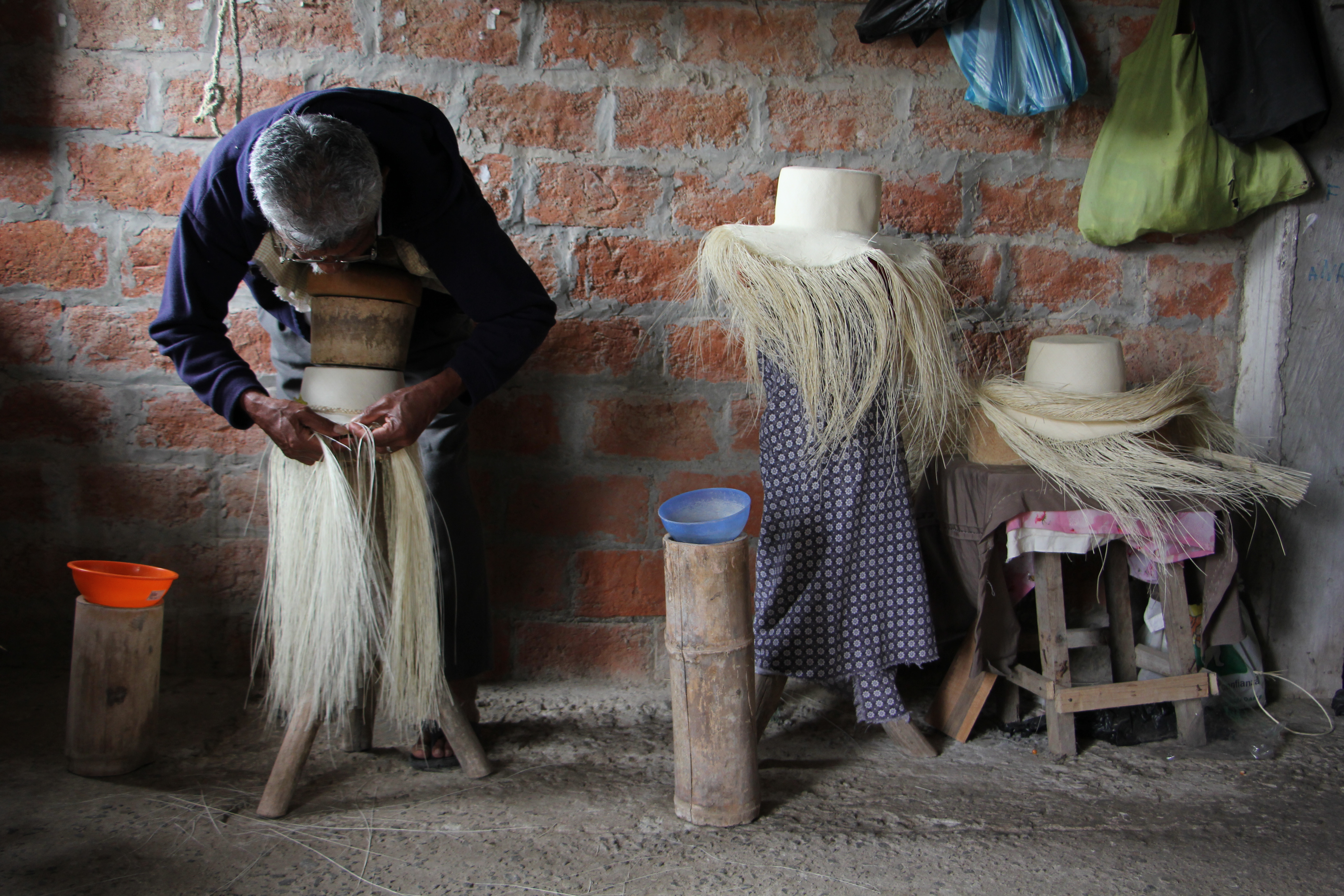
The toquilla straw hat is woven from fibres from a palm tree characteristic of the Ecuadorian coast. Cenovio is a master weaver, with over 70 years of experience.

The best quality hats are known as Montecristis, after the town of Montecristi, Ecuador, where they are produced. The rarest and most expensive Panama hats are hand-woven with up to 3000 weaves per square inch. In February 2014, Simon Espinal, an Ecuadorian 47-year-old Panama hat weaver considered to be among the best at his craft, set a world record by creating a Panama hat with four thousand weaves per square inch that took eight months to handcraft from beginning to end.

According to popular lore, a "superfino" Panama hat can hold water, and, when rolled up, pass through a wedding ring.

== Name ==
Despite their name, Panama hats originated in Ecuador where they are made to this day. Historically, throughout Central and South America, people referred to Panama hats as "Jipijapa", "Toquilla", or "Montecristi" hats (the latter two phrases are still in use today). Their designation as Panama hats originated in the 19th century, when Ecuadorian hat makers emigrated to Panama, where they were able to achieve much greater trade volumes.

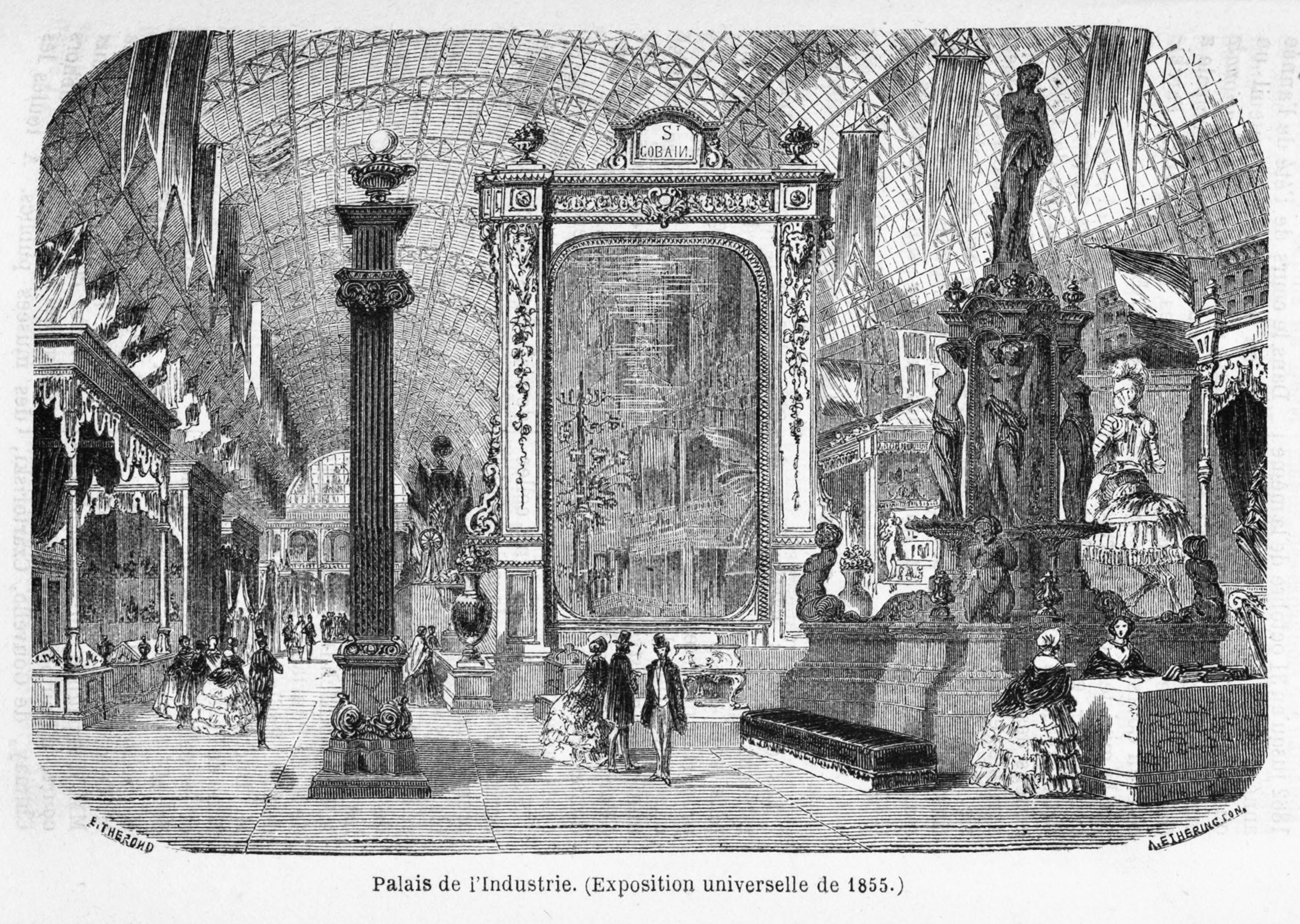
Panama hats first appeared internationally at the 1855 World's Fair in Paris.

Ecuador's low tourism and international trade levels during the 1850s prompted hat makers to take their crafts to the busy trade center of Panama. There, the hat makers were able to sell more hats than they ever could in Ecuador. The hats were sold to gold prospectors traveling through Panama to California during the historic Californian Gold Rush. Travelers would tell people admiring their hats that they bought them in Panama. So, the hats quickly became known as "Panama hats".

Soon after at the 1855 World's Fair in Paris, Panama hats were featured for the first time on a global scale. However, the Fair's catalog did not mention Ecuador as its country of origin. It listed this type of hat as a "cloth hat" even though it was clearly not made out of cloth.

The name "Panama hat" was further reinforced by U.S. President Theodore Roosevelt's trip to oversee the construction of the Panama Canal. Roosevelt used his natural ability to drum up publicity by posing for a series of photos at the Panama Canal construction site in 1906. Photographic technology was relatively new at the time, and President Roosevelt was not shy about using the press to his advantage. Photos of his visit showed a strong, rugged leader dressed crisply in light-colored suits sporting Ecuadorian-made straw Panama hats.

== See also ==
- List of hat styles
- Buntal hat or "East Indian Panama hat", from the Philippines
