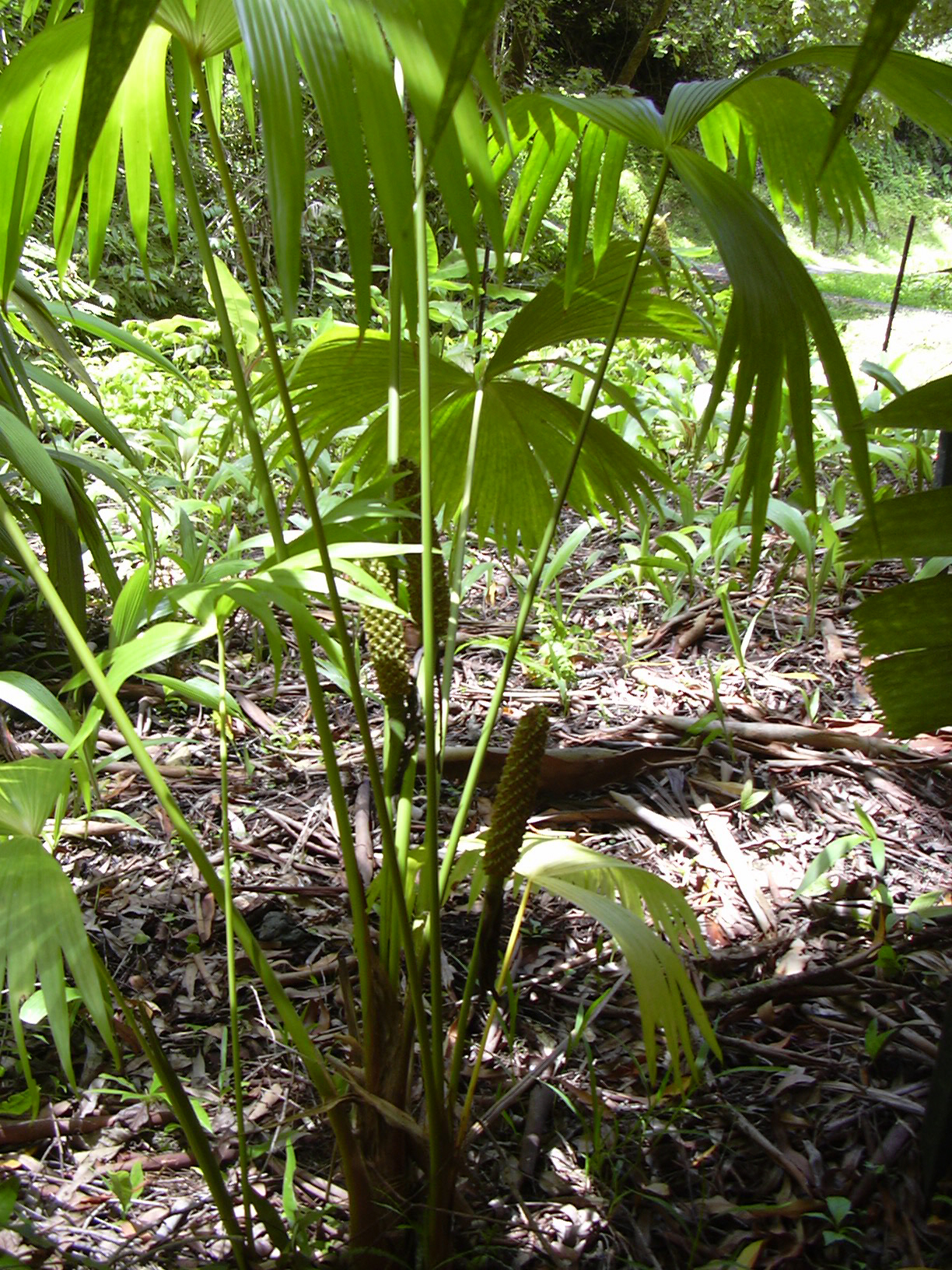
- Carludovica palmata

Scientific classification
- Kingdom: Plantae
- Clade: Embryophytes
- Clade: Tracheophytes
- Clade: Spermatophytes
- Clade: Angiosperms
- Clade: Monocots
- Order: Pandanales
- Family: Cyclanthaceae; Poit. ex A.Rich.

Genera
- See text

= Cyclanthaceae =

Family of flowering plants

Cyclanthaceae is a family of flowering plants.

== Taxonomy ==
Earlier systems, such as the Cronquist system and the Takhtajan system, placed it as the sole family in the order Cyclanthales. In the classification system of Dahlgren the Cyclanthaceae were the sole family of the order Cyclanthales in the superorder Cyclanthiflorae (also called Cyclanthanae).

The APG system (1998) and the APG II system (2003) assign it to the order Pandanales in the clade monocots. The family occurs in the neotropics and consists of 12 genera with a total of ca 230 known species (Christenhusz & Byng 2016).

- Cyclanthaceae
  - - - - - - Stelestylis
            - Chorigyne
          - Sphaeradenia
        - Ludovia
      - - - - - Evodianthus
              - Dianthoveus
            - Carludovica
          - - Asplundia
            - Thoracocarpus
        - Dicranopygium
    - Schultesiophytum
  - Cyclanthus

=== List of genera ===
- Asplundia Harling
- Carludovica Ruiz & Pav.
- Chorigyne R.Erikss.
- Cyclanthus Poit.
- Dianthoveus Hammel & Wilder
- Dicranopygium Harling
- Evodianthus Oerst.
- Ludovia Brongn.
- Schultesiophytum Harling
- Sphaeradenia Harling
- Stelestylis Drude
- Thoracocarpus Harling

== Cultivation and uses ==
The family is probably best known for Carludovica palmata, the young leaves of which are made into Panama hats.

An unidentified species belonging to this family (possibly a Carludovica species) has been marketed as a houseplant in the United States under the name "Jungle Drum".

Carludovica divergens is added to some versions of the hallucinogenic drink Ayahuasca.

== Bibliography ==
- Cyclanthaceaein L. Watson and M. J. Dallwitz (1992 onwards),
- Archived 2016-03-03 at the Wayback Machine
- NCBI Taxonomy Browser: Cyclanthaceae
- CSDL, Texas: Cyclanthaceae Archived 2007-04-21 at the Wayback Machine
- Media related to Cyclanthaceae at Wikimedia Commons
- Data related to Cyclanthaceae at Wikispecies
