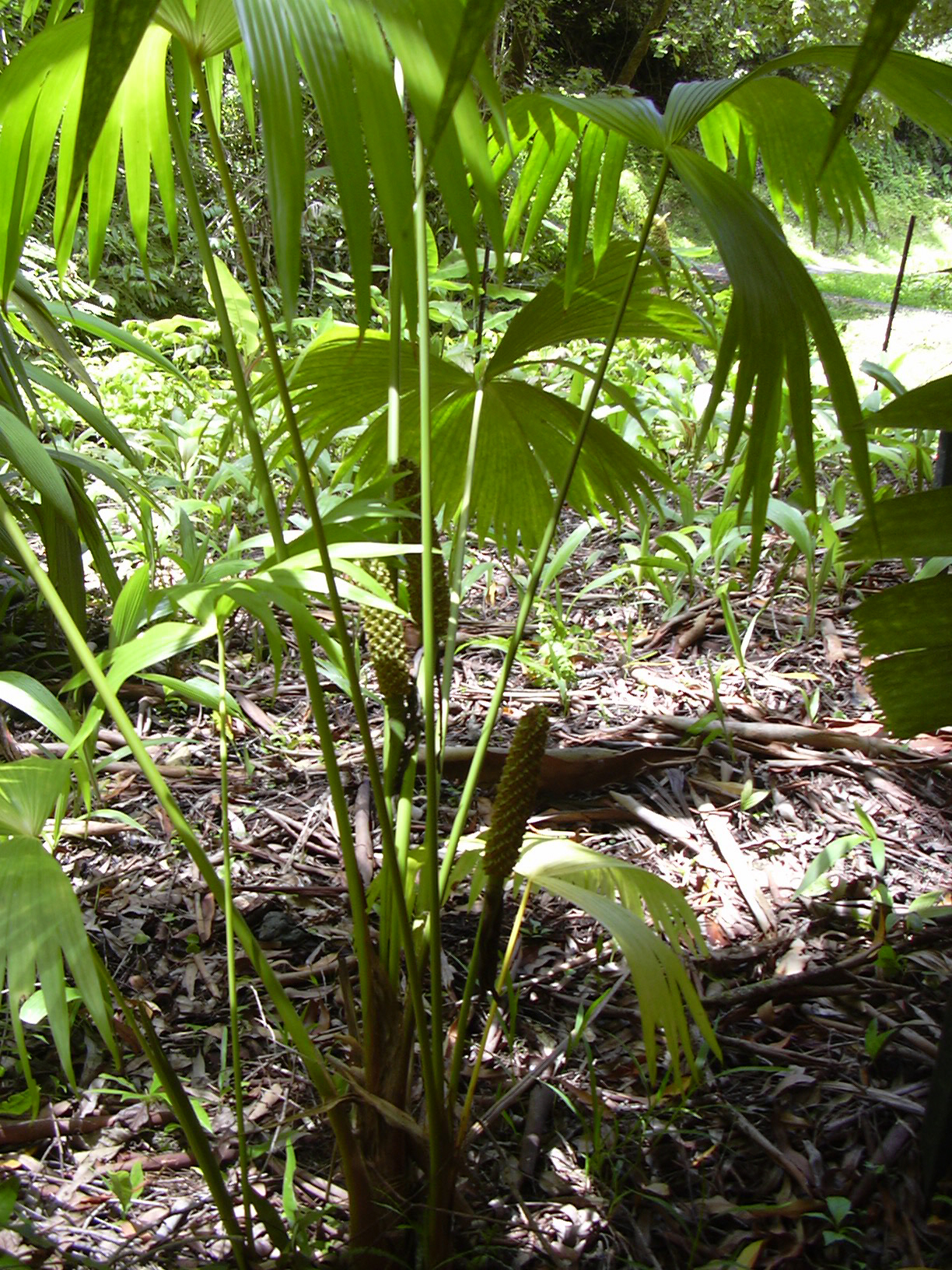
- Carludovica palmata

Scientific classification
- Kingdom: Plantae
- Clade: Tracheophytes
- Clade: Angiosperms
- Clade: Monocots
- Order: Pandanales; R.Br. ex Bercht. & J.Presl

Type species
- Pandanus tectorius Parkinson

Families
- Cyclanthaceae; Pandanaceae; Stemonaceae; Triuridaceae; Velloziaceae

= Pandanales =

Pandanales Temporal range: Mid Cretaceous – Recent 114–0 Ma

Order of monocot flowering plants

Pandanales, the pandans or screw-pines, is an order of flowering plants placed in the monocot clade in the Angiosperm Phylogeny Group and Angiosperm Phylogeny Web systems. Within the monocots Pandanales are grouped in the lilioid monocots where they are in a sister group relationship with the Dioscoreales. Historically the order has consisted of a number of different families in different systems but modern classification of the order is based primarily on molecular phylogenetics despite diverse morphology which previously placed many of the families in other groupings based on apparent similarity. Members of the order have a subtropical distribution and includes trees, shrubs, and vines as well as herbaceous plants. The order consists of 5 families, 36 genera and about 1,610 species.

== Description ==
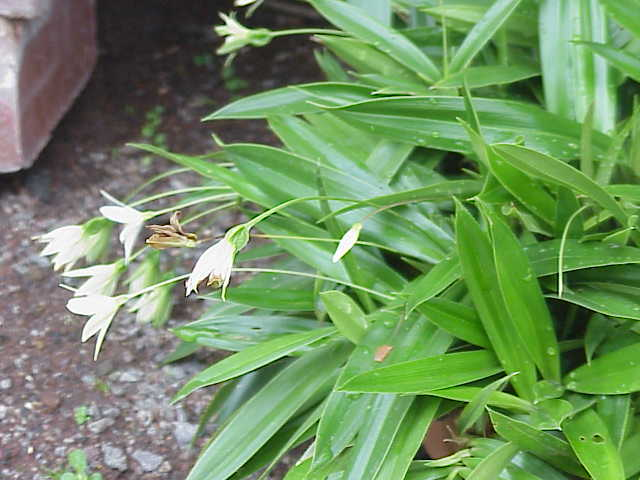
Xerophyta elegans

Pandanales are highly diverse including large arboraceous plants of tropical rainforests and coastal areas, climbing vines and lianas, as well as very small achlorophyllous (mycoheterotrophic) and saprophytic herbaceous forest floor species. This has made it difficult to reliably define synapomorphies, but the loss of trimery distinguishes many of them from other lilioid monocots.

The Pandanales order is distinctive with its highly variable and hardly definable floral morphology, especially the number of stamens and their structure as well as many other characteristics. In some of the members, different interpretations exist regarding the composition and organization of the reproductive structures.

The order includes plants with traits that seem atypical when compared to other groups of monocots. A good example is the female reproductive organ and its position relative to other parts of the flower. Some of the species included in the families Pandanaceae and Stemonaceae show flowers formed from only one carpel, while in the Triuridaceae, a family that lacks chlorophyll, the carpels are free from each other. In fact, the Triuridaceae possess the least "typical" flower morphology in the order.

== Taxonomy ==
=== History ===
The components of the order sensu APG have been difficult to place consistently, and historically have been associated with a number of other groupings. The Bentham & Hooker system (1883) had a similar order under the name Nudifloreae, incorporating:

- Pandaneae
- Cyclanthaceae
- Typhaceae
- Aroideae
- Lemnaceae

The Wettstein system (1935) placed the order in class Monocotyledones and used a different circumscription, incorporating:

- Pandanaceae
- Sparganiaceae
- Typhaceae

The Cronquist system (1981) placed the order in subclass Arecidae in class Liliopsida [=monocotyledons] with only one family:

- Pandanaceae

In the classification system of Dahlgren the Pandanales were in the superorder Pandaniflorae (also called Pandananae) with the single family Pandanaceae.

=== Angiosperm Phylogeny Group ===
The APG III system (2009) places the Pandanales in the monocots. Both the APG III and APG II systems include five families in this order. Since the morphology of the order varies on such scale, its classification and phylogeny are based on genetic analyses.

Inside the order, some doubt remains about the position of the entirely mycoheterotrophic family Triuridaceae, since it is the only one on which genetic analyses have not yet been applied. With high probability, the family may be sister to the Velloziaceae, but similarities with the family Zingiberaceae (which is a part of a whole different order – Zingiberales) do not exclude the chance for a different phylogeny. The family Velloziaceae on its own is placed at the base of the tree. The Pandanaceae and Cyclanthaceae are sister groups, and they form a clade which on its own is sister to the Stemonaceae (a family composed of two more clades).

=== Evolution ===
The order Dioscoreales holds sister relationship with Pandanales by diverging from them around 121 million years ago in the mid-Cretaceous. The formation of the crown groups took place with a difference of 2 million years between the orders - 116 Mya for the Dioscoreales and 114 Mya for the Pandanales. However, the stem group of the Pandanales is much older and goes back to 130 Mya in the early Cretaceous.

=== Phylogeny ===
- - Dioscoreales
  - Pandanales
    - Velloziaceae
    - Triuridaceae
    - - Stemonaceae
      - - Pandanaceae
        - Cyclanthaceae

=== Subdivision ===
The composition of the order in APG III and APG II were slightly from that in the 1998 APG system, which used the circumscription

- Cyclanthaceae
- Pandanaceae
- Stemonaceae
- Velloziaceae

APG III includes the following families;

- Cyclanthaceae
- Pandanaceae
- Stemonaceae
- Triuridaceae
- Velloziaceae

== Distribution ==
The order contains members mainly distributed in all the tropical and subtropical regions of the world, both New and Old World (including Africa, South America, Australia and Asia). Also, a species is present in China.

== Ecology ==
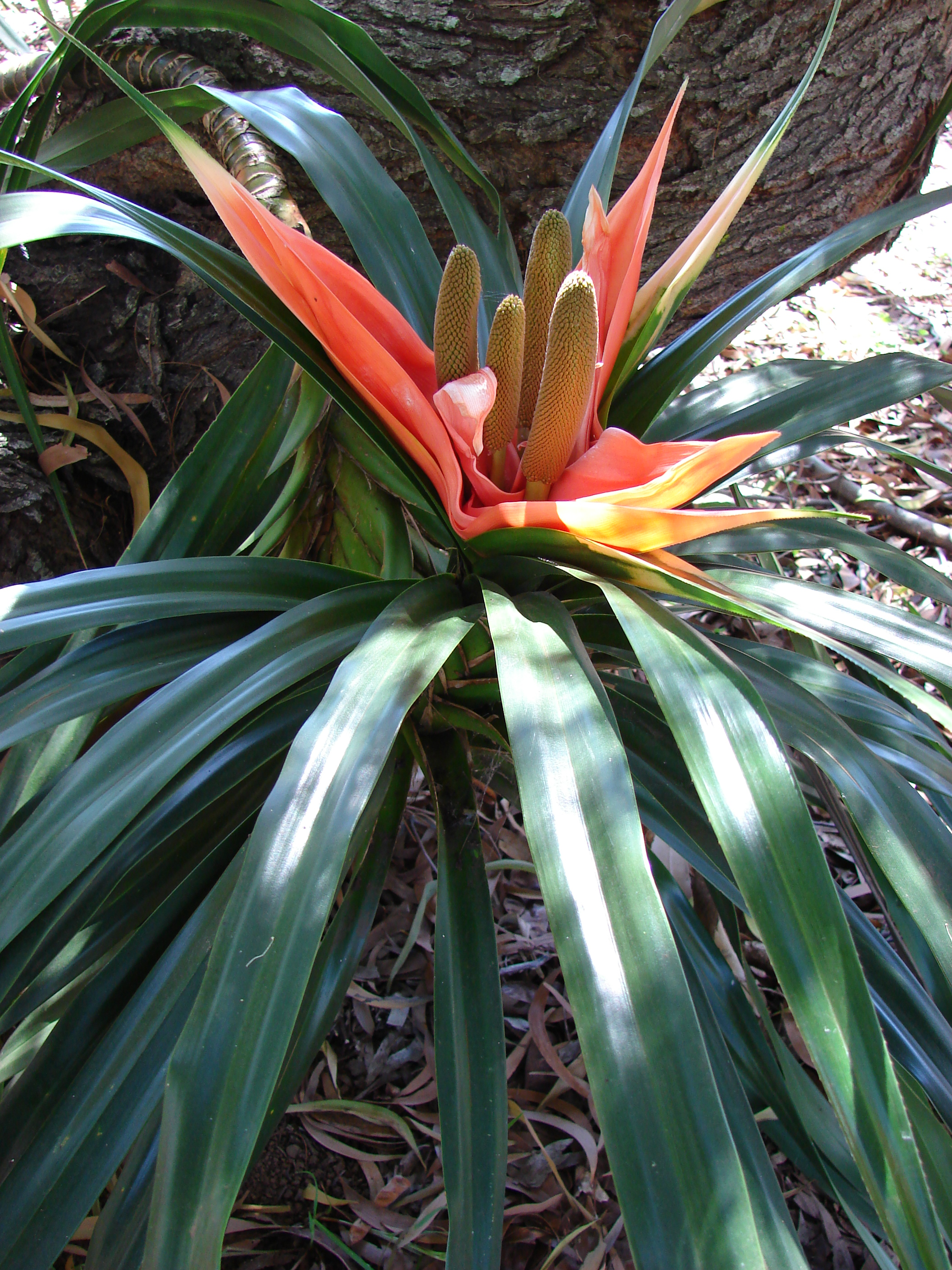
Freycinetia arborea - member of the Pandanaceae

The species are members of various ecological groups, including tropical shrubs, lianas and trees, xerophytic plants, mycoheterotrophs, as well as different herbaceous representatives.

== Uses ==
Several species in this order produce strap-like leaves used for basketry and mats; Pandanus (Pandanaceae) is used across Oceania for thatch, basketry, and to make cloth, and Carludovica palmata (Cyclanthaceae) leaves are made into Panama hats. Other members as Stemona are present in traditional Chinese medicine and possess medical properties. Some species are used as insecticides. Some species of Pandanus are used as ornamentals. Pandanus amaryllifolius is a common food flavoring in Southeast Asia and karuka (Pandanus julianettii) is a staple food in New Guinea.

== Bibliography ==
- Rudall, Paula J.; Bateman, Richard M. (1 April 2006). "Morphological Phylogenetic Analysis of Pandanales: Testing Contrasting Hypotheses of Floral Evolution". Systematic Botany. 31 (2): 223–238. doi:10.1600/036364406777585766. S2CID 86213914.
- Rudall, Paula J.; Cunniff, Jennifer; Wilkin, Paul; Caddick, Lizabeth R. (1 August 2005). "Evolution of Dimery, Pentamery and the Monocarpellary Condition in the Monocot Family Stemonaceae (Pandanales)". Taxon. 54 (3): 701–711. doi:10.2307/25065427. JSTOR 25065427.
