= Motleyothamnus =

Conservation status
- Least Concern (IUCN 3.1)

Scientific classification
- Kingdom: Plantae
- Clade: Tracheophytes
- Clade: Angiosperms
- Clade: Eudicots
- Clade: Asterids
- Order: Gentianales
- Family: Rubiaceae
- Genus: Motleyothamnus; Paudyal & Delprete
- Species: M. corymbosus

Binomial name
- Motleyothamnus corymbosus (Ruiz & Pav.) Paudyal & Delprete

Genus of plants

Motleyothamnus is a monotypic genus of flowering plants belonging to the family Rubiaceae. The only species is Motleyothamnus corymbosus.

The species is found in Peru.

The genus name of Motleyothamnus is in honour of Timothy 'Tim' J. Motley (1966–2013), who was an American botanist, Professor of Botany at the Old Dominion University and Director of the Botanical Garden in Norfolk, Virginia.

The genus was circumscribed by Sushil K. Paudyal and Piero G. Delprete in Bot. J. Linn. Soc. vol.187 (Issue 3) on page 386 in 2018.
