= Riqueuria =

Scientific classification
- Kingdom: Plantae
- Clade: Tracheophytes
- Clade: Angiosperms
- Clade: Eudicots
- Clade: Asterids
- Order: Gentianales
- Family: Rubiaceae
- Genus: Riqueuria; Ruiz & Pav.

Species of plants

Riqueuria is a monotypic genus of flowering plants belonging to the family Rubiaceae. It only contains one known species, Riqueuria avenia Ruiz & Pav.

It is native to Peru, and is found in groves or forests.

The genus name Riqueuria is in honour of Ludovico Riqueur (d. 1737), a court apothecary during the time of Philip V of Spain and a cultivator of exotic trees. The reason for the Latin specific epithet of avenia has not been published. It was first described and published in Flora Peruvia Prodrom on page 18 in 1794. The species was published in Flora Peruvia Vol. 1 on page 70 in 1798.
