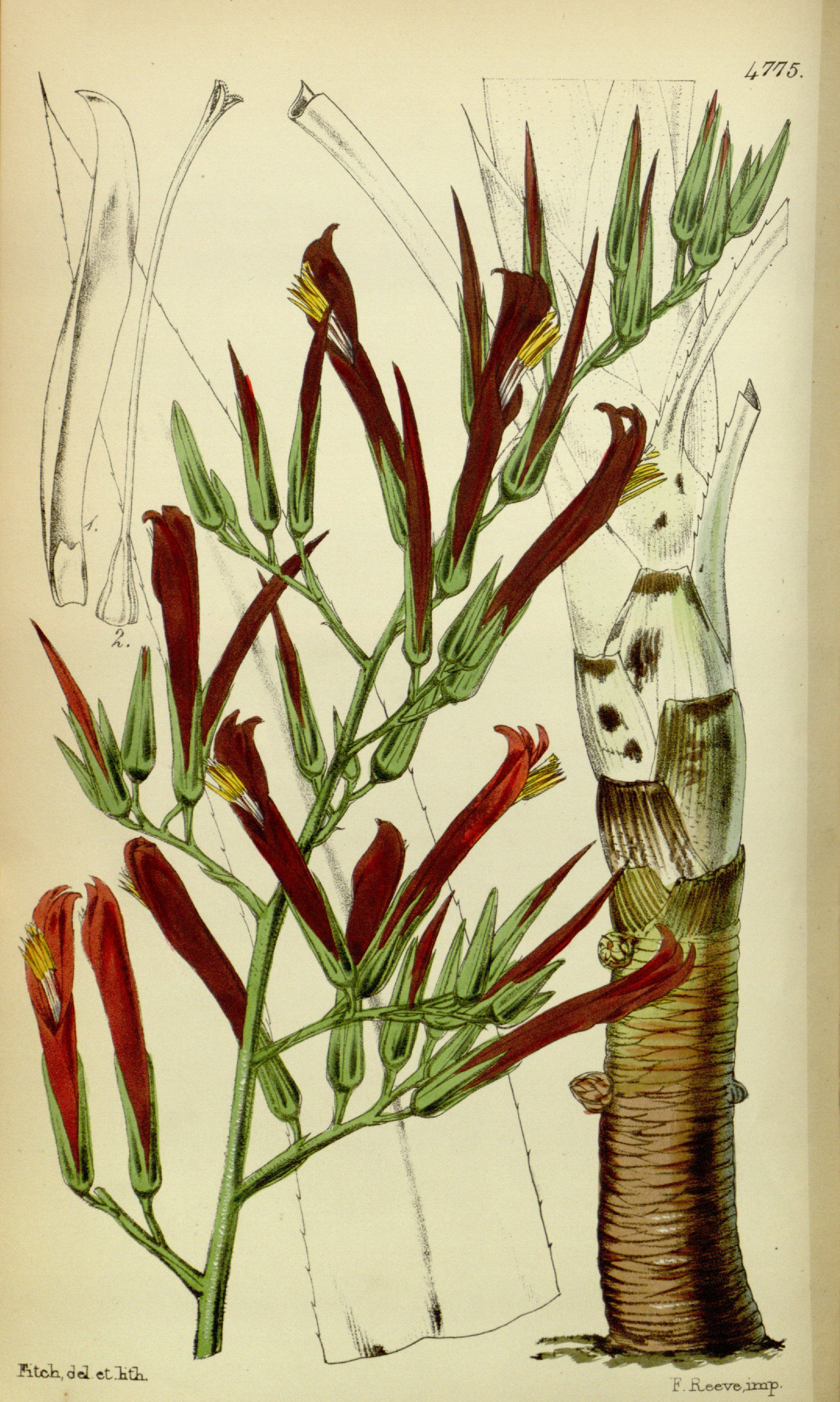

Scientific classification
- Kingdom: Plantae
- Clade: Tracheophytes
- Clade: Angiosperms
- Clade: Monocots
- Clade: Commelinids
- Order: Poales
- Family: Bromeliaceae
- Genus: Pitcairnia
- Species: P. paniculata

Binomial name
- Pitcairnia paniculata (Ruiz & Pav.) Ruiz & Pav.

Synonyms
- Hepetis paniculata (Ruiz & Pav.) Mez; Pourretia paniculata Ruiz & Pav.; Pitcairnia biattenuata Rusby; Pitcairnia excelsa É.Morren; Pitcairnia fruticetorum Mez; Pitcairnia longifolia Hook.

= Pitcairnia paniculata =

Species of flowering plant

Pitcairnia paniculata is a species of flowering plant in the family Bromeliaceae. This species is native to Bolivia.
