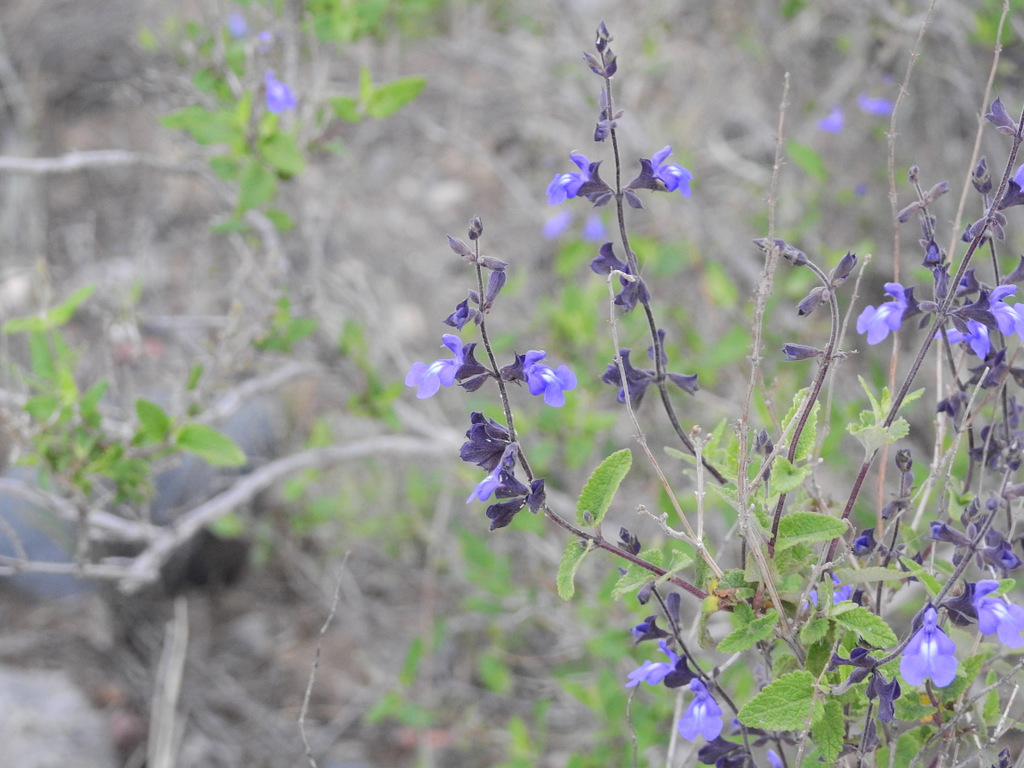

Scientific classification
- Kingdom: Plantae
- Clade: Tracheophytes
- Clade: Angiosperms
- Clade: Eudicots
- Clade: Asterids
- Order: Lamiales
- Family: Lamiaceae
- Genus: Salvia
- Species: S. cuspidata

Binomial name
- Salvia cuspidata Ruiz & Pav.

Subspecies
- S. cuspidata subsp. gilliesii J.R.I. Wood & Harley; S. cuspidata subsp. bangii (Rusby) J.R.I.Wood

= Salvia cuspidata =

Species of plant

Salvia cuspidata is a species of perennial shrub in the family Lamiaceae. It is native to the Andes mountains in Bolivia, Chile, and Peru, growing at elevations up to 10,000 ft (3,000 m).

Salvia cuspidata subsp. gilliesii, originally named Salvia gilliesii by George Bentham in 1873, was renamed Salvia cuspidata subsp. gilliesii in 2007. It has been only recently that gardeners have discovered the plant. It has been grown and distributed on the French Riviera since 1994 and in the U.S. since 2002.

Salvia cuspidata subsp. gilliesii reaches up to 9 ft (2.7 m) in its native habitat—somewhat less in cultivation. New stems in early spring are light green and square, quickly becoming rounded, woody, and a soft gray color. The many upright stems in a small space give the plant a tall, airy appearance. The lanceolate-shaped, serrated leaves are graduated in size, with white undersides that have pronounced veining, and lightly cover the plant. There are 3–6 flowers in well-spaced whorls on branched inflorescences. The small flowers are 0.75 in (1.9 cm) long, and are a deep sky-blue with a purple undertone, held in a tiny calyx that is purple on the side turned to the sun and green underneath. The upper lip has a whitish dusting, the wider lower lip has two white lines that lead insects to the nectar.
