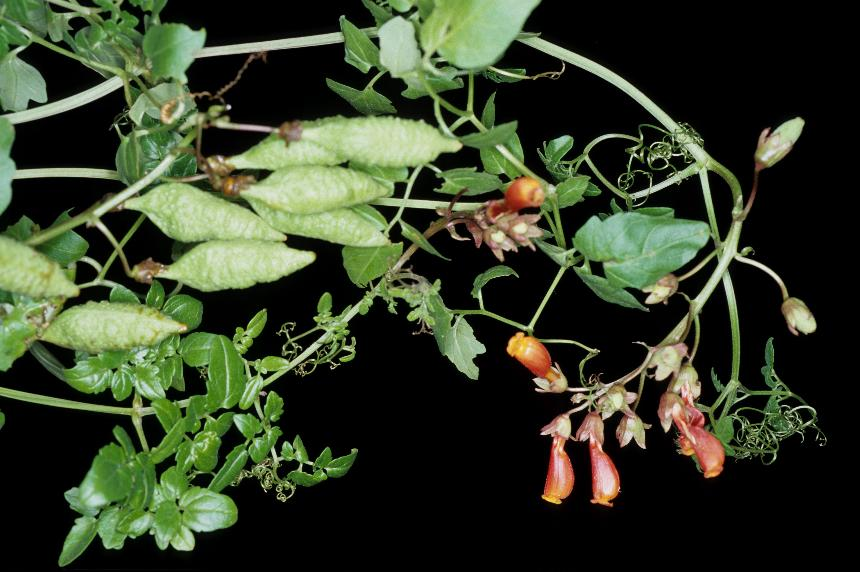

Scientific classification
- Kingdom: Plantae
- Clade: Tracheophytes
- Clade: Angiosperms
- Clade: Eudicots
- Clade: Asterids
- Order: Lamiales
- Family: Bignoniaceae
- Genus: Eccremocarpus
- Species: E. scaber

Binomial name
- Eccremocarpus scaber Ruiz & Pav.

Synonyms
- Calampelis scaber (Ruiz & Pav.) Sweet; Calampelis scabra (Ruiz & Pav.) Sweet; Dombeya nodiflora L'Hér. ex DC.; Eccremocarpus ruber Regel; Eccremocarpus scaber var. aurea Benary; Eccremocarpus scaber carmineus (Spigolatore) Pynaert; Eccremocarpus scaber var. carmineus Spigolatore; Eccremocarpus scaber var. roseus Huxley; Eccremocarpus scaber var. sepium Bertero ex DC.; Eccremocarpus sepium Bertero; Tourrettia scabra Dombey ex DC.

= Eccremocarpus scaber =

Species of flowering plant

Eccremocarpus scaber, the Chilean glory-flower or Chilean glory creeper, is a species of perennial plant in the family Bignoniaceae. It is found in Chile.

== Description ==
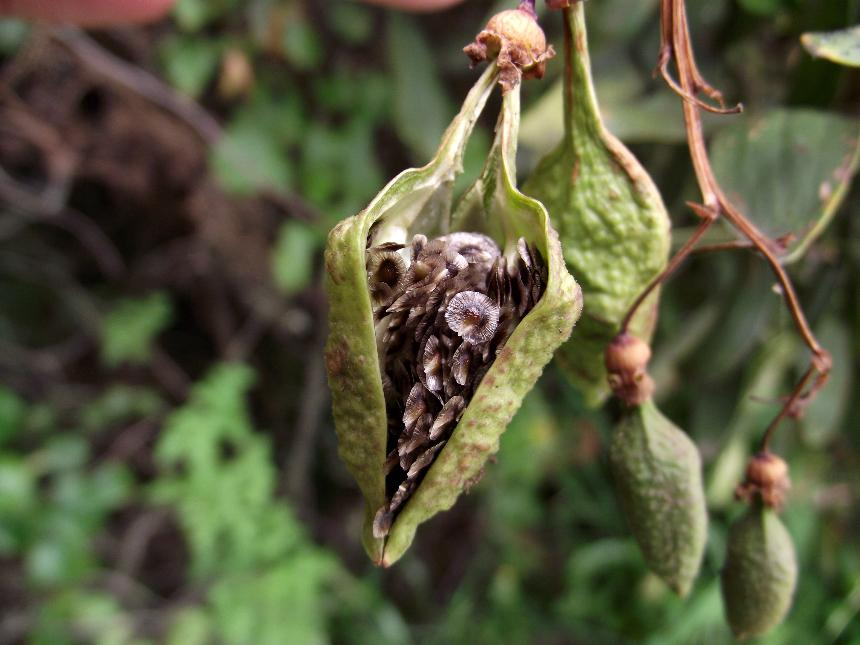

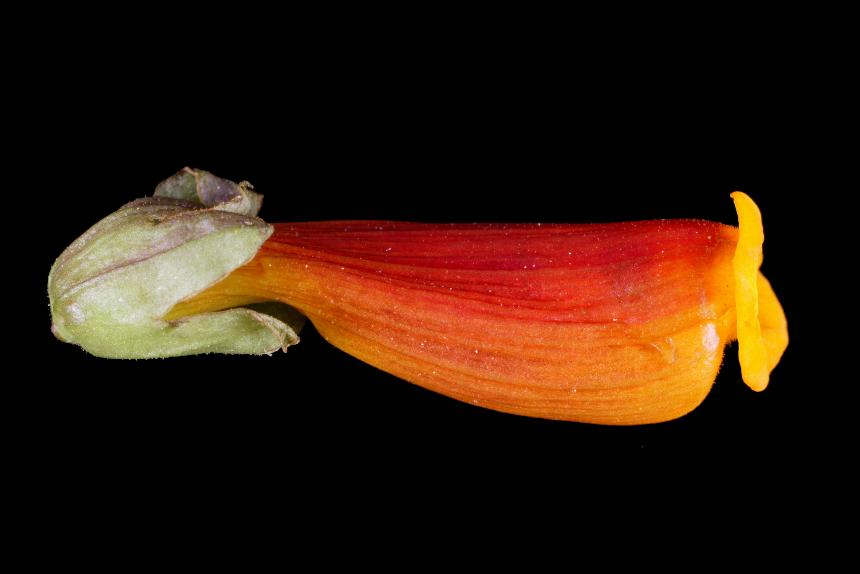

Chilean glory creepers are a many branched perennial vine or climbing shrub with a woody base that is evergreen or deciduous in colder climates. The plant has thin pinnate leaves alternating on the stem and leaflets that are light green. The leaves can have small fine hairs but are mostly glabrous. Leaves are 2 cm long with the younger branches hosting 2 leaves and the older branches having 3–7 leaflets. Leaf shape is oval with obvious pinnate structured veins, size of leaves may vary.

Flowers consist of a tubular structure with rounded petals rounding back at the tip and bright orange-red outer rings with a red centre. Tendrils have the ability to 'hook' onto surroundings for grip and structure support. Flowering from September to May with a glossy, oval wrinkled fruit capsule that contains black seeds and a prominent wing helping with wind dispersal. Fragments of the stem can also spread seeds. The fruit capsule size is roughly 4.5 high by 2 cm girth.

== Distribution and habitat ==
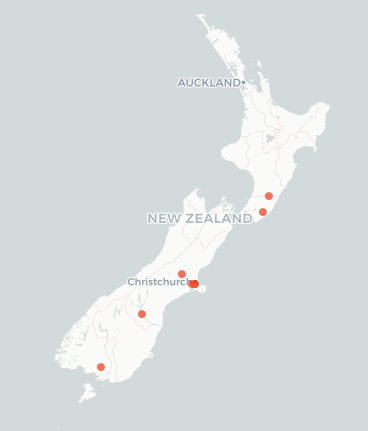

Chilean glory creeper vines tend to prefer forest edges, roadsides and waste areas where there is abundant sun and the ability to drain well, being located on the outskirts it can tolerate some shade. Areas such as the North Island and warmer temperatures of the south island i.e. Canterbury, southland and central Otago.

Native to Chile these include Chilean Andes, Peru, Colombia, Ecuador, the Americas and Mediterranean Europe (tropical climates).

This climbing vine is considered a weed in New Zealand which is recognised by the National Pest Plant Accord. It gets this reputation due to its rapid growth and large amounts of seed production, combined with the nature of its growth habits i.e. covering growth of smaller plants and trees which can be of native species. Varieties with pink, yellow or deep scarlet flowers are also available.

=== Habitat preferences ===
Preferring warmer, well-drained areas, they are generally found on the outskirts of forests, roadsides and waste areas requiring a soil pH of 5.5–7.5. These vines thrive wherever conditions are right and so much so they are considered a pest/weed, yet are generally employed as an ornamental.

Grown as an annual plant in New Zealand, it cannot tolerate too-cool climates, nor is it winter hardy. Generally found in the forest outskirts of the North Islands and the South Islands warmer climates of Canterbury and Otago.

== Life cycle/phenology (timing of events) ==
The Chilean glory vine is a (half) hardy evergreen perennial vine that flowers in summer, taking around 8 weeks to germinate at 16–21 °C. The speed at which growth can occur can be as much as 8–10 feet. Flowering continuously from spring to autumn. At the first planting stage the plants are not hardy enough to survive a harsh winter however if the roots are shaded by another plant and the tops are getting adequate sun they may die down (foliage can survive the winter) and reappear larger and stronger the following year. They are considered perennials but many gardeners will grow them as annuals. Consisting of four stems and growing in clusters of 4 to 6 inches long, Eccremocarpus scaber flowers from late spring to autumn and can flower the first year if planted early.

== Predators, parasites and diseases ==
When growing, parasites to be aware of are spider mites when grown outside and whiteflies if grown using a greenhouse. Green fly may be present but generally disease free.

== Other information ==
This vine has received the RHS's award of garden Merit (AGM). It can be woven through a trellis, fencing, decking other roses and clematis (leather flower). This vine is considered to be gold within the ornamental gardener's community.

== History ==
"Eccremocarpus was first described in 1794 by Ruiz and Pavon, who soon after 1798 described two species, Eccremocarpus viridis from Peru and E. scaber from Chile".
