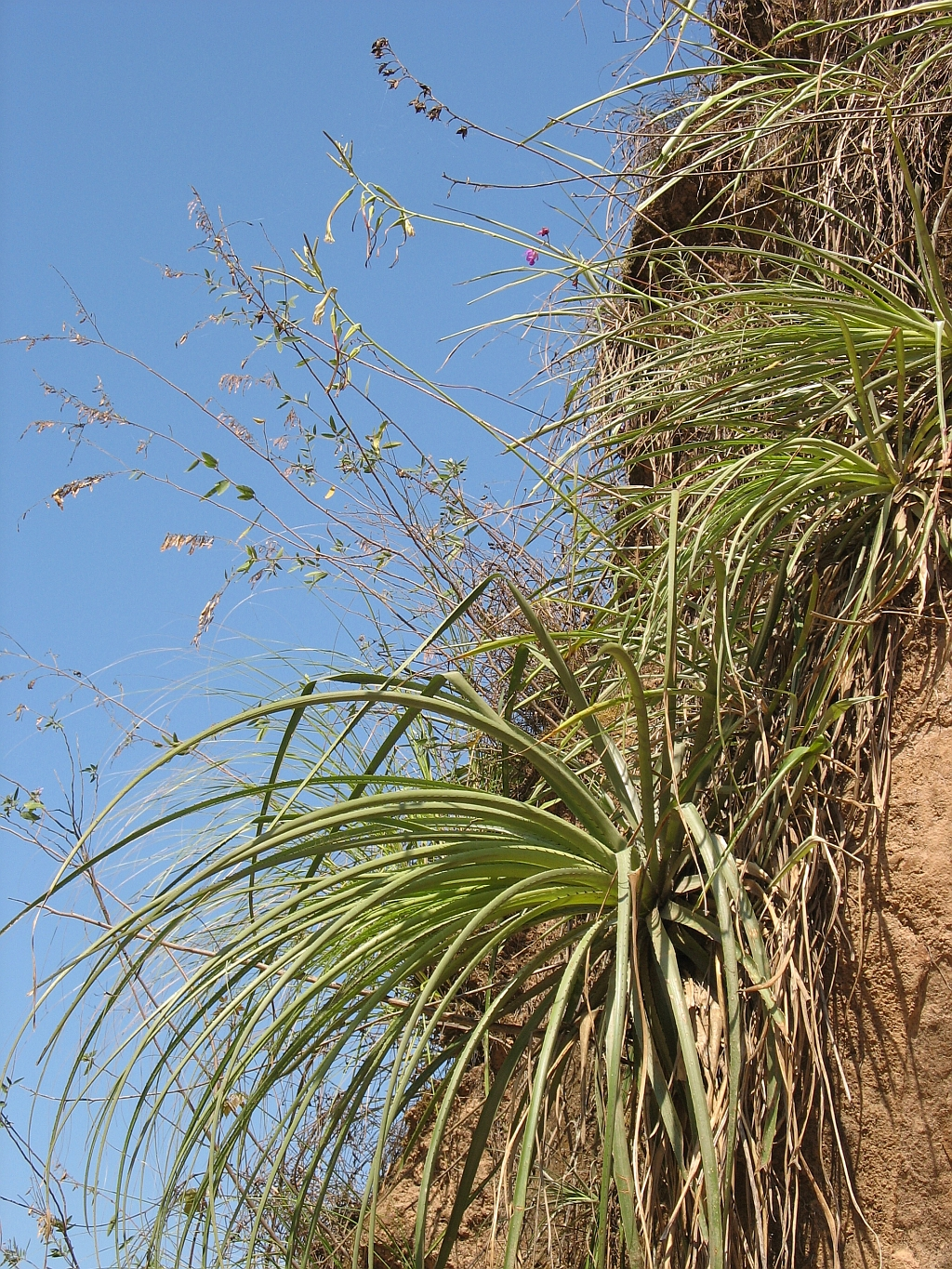
- Pitcairnia lanuginosa in habitat in Bolivia

Scientific classification
- Kingdom: Plantae
- Clade: Tracheophytes
- Clade: Angiosperms
- Clade: Monocots
- Clade: Commelinids
- Order: Poales
- Family: Bromeliaceae
- Genus: Pitcairnia
- Species: P. lanuginosa

Binomial name
- Pitcairnia lanuginosa Ruiz & Pav.

Synonyms
- Orthopetalum lanuginosum (Ruiz & Pav.) Beer; Puya ruiziana Mez; Hepetis burchellii (Mez) Mez; Hepetis caldasiana (Baker) Mez; Hepetis subpetiolata (Baker) Mez; Pitcairnia burchellii Mez; Pitcairnia caldasiana Baker; Pitcairnia sessiliflora Rusby; Pitcairnia subpetiolata Baker

= Pitcairnia lanuginosa =

Species of plant

Pitcairnia lanuginosa is a species of flowering plant in the family Bromeliaceae. This species is native to Bolivia and Brazil.
