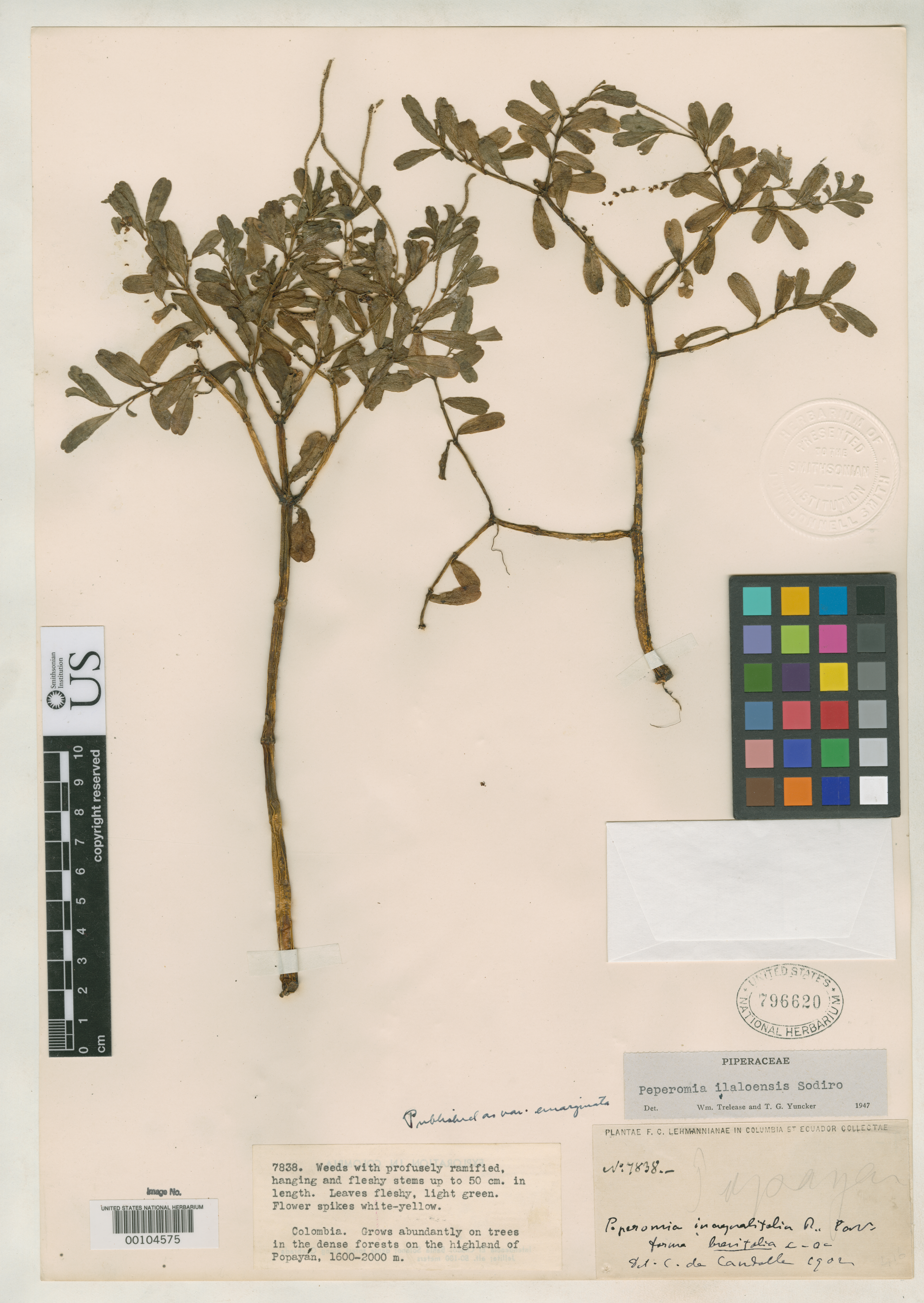
- Peperomia inaequalifolia

Scientific classification
- Kingdom: Plantae
- Clade: Tracheophytes
- Clade: Angiosperms
- Clade: Magnoliids
- Order: Piperales
- Family: Piperaceae
- Genus: Peperomia
- Species: P. inaequalifolia

Binomial name
- Peperomia inaequalifolia Ruiz & Pav.

Synonyms
- Piper inaequalifolium (Ruiz & Pav.) Vahl; Peperomia atocongona Trel.; Peperomia chrysotricha Miq.; Peperomia fasciculata Sodiro; Peperomia galioides var. minutifolia C.DC.; Peperomia limaensis Trel.; Peperomia parvula Sodiro; Peperomia pseudogalapagensis Trel.; Piper aromaticum Willd.; Schilleria inaequalifolia Kunth

= Peperomia inaequalifolia =

Species of plant

Peperomia inaequalifolia is a species of flowering plant in the family Piperaceae. Its native range covers Colombia and Peru, where it grows in tropical and subtropical forests. The plant typically has thick, fleshy leaves and is often found growing as an epiphyte, clinging to trees in humid environments. Like other species in the genus, it is sometimes cultivated as a decorative houseplant due to its attractive foliage and ability to thrive in low-light conditions.
