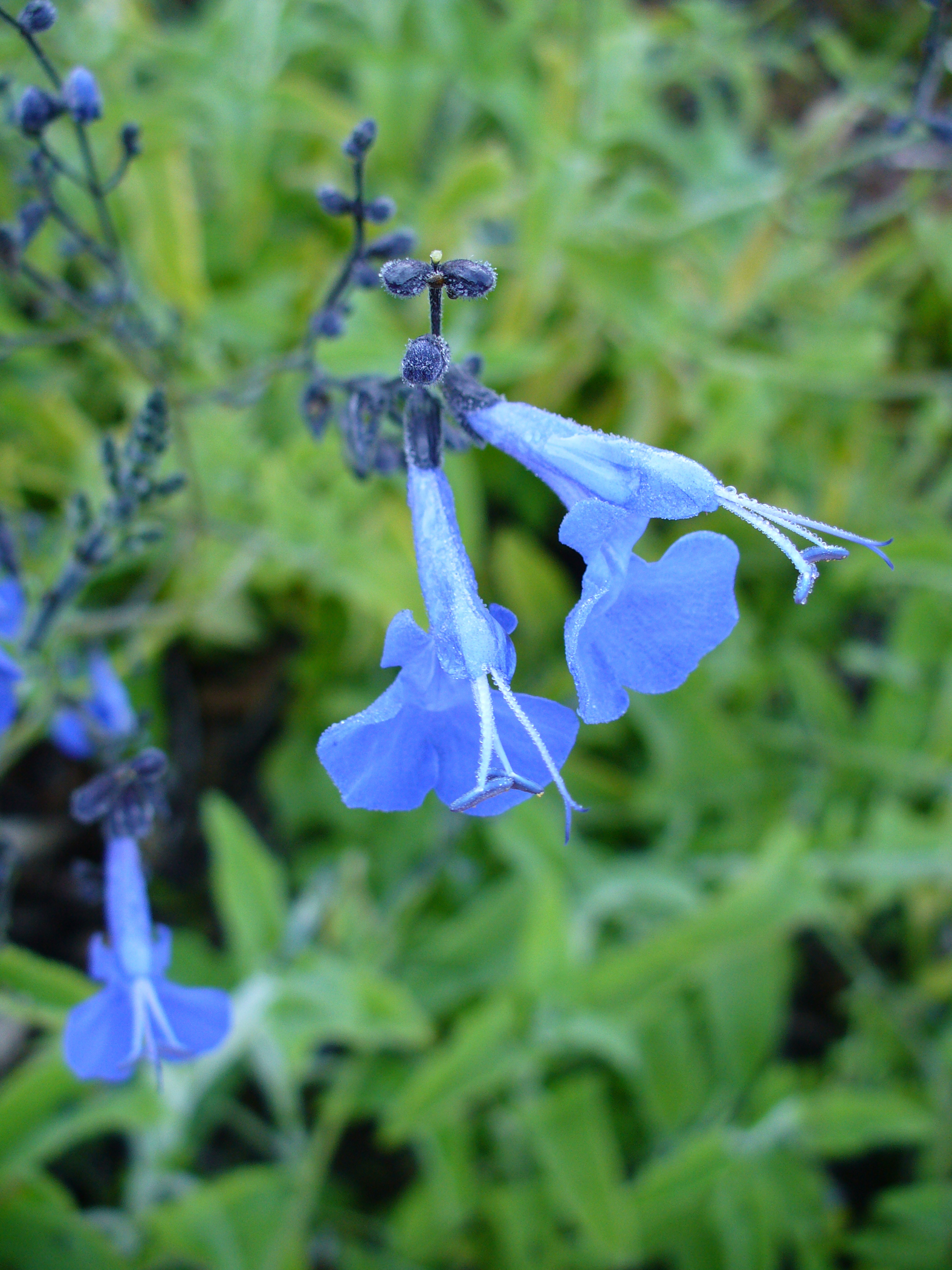

Scientific classification
- Kingdom: Plantae
- Clade: Tracheophytes
- Clade: Angiosperms
- Clade: Eudicots
- Clade: Asterids
- Order: Lamiales
- Family: Lamiaceae
- Genus: Salvia
- Species: S. sagittata

Binomial name
- Salvia sagittata Ruiz & Pav.

Synonyms
- Salvia rumicifolia Kunth; Salvia rumicifolia var. minor Benth.

= Salvia sagittata =

Species of plant

Salvia sagittata is a species of herbaceous perennial plant in the family Lamiaceae. It is native to the Andes Mountains, growing at elevations from 9,500 to 10,500 ft (2,900 to 3,200 m). The specific epithet refers to the arrow-shaped leaves. The plant was collected and named in 1798 by Hipólito Ruiz López and José Antonio Pavón Jiménez, two Spanish botanists who spent ten years in Peru and Chile on a commission by the government of Spain to go to the New World in search of new medicinal and agricultural plants.

Salvia sagittata reportedly reaches 7.5 ft (2.3 m) tall in the wild and 2.5 ft (0.76 m) in cultivation. It is covered with yellow-green leaves that are rugose on the upper surface—with the underside covered with short white hairs and heavily veined. The inflorescences are very sticky, reaching up to 2 ft (0.61 m) long above the leafy stems. The 1 in (2.5 cm) flowers are a brilliant blue, with a spreading lower lip. A pistil and two yellow stamens show in the upper lip.
