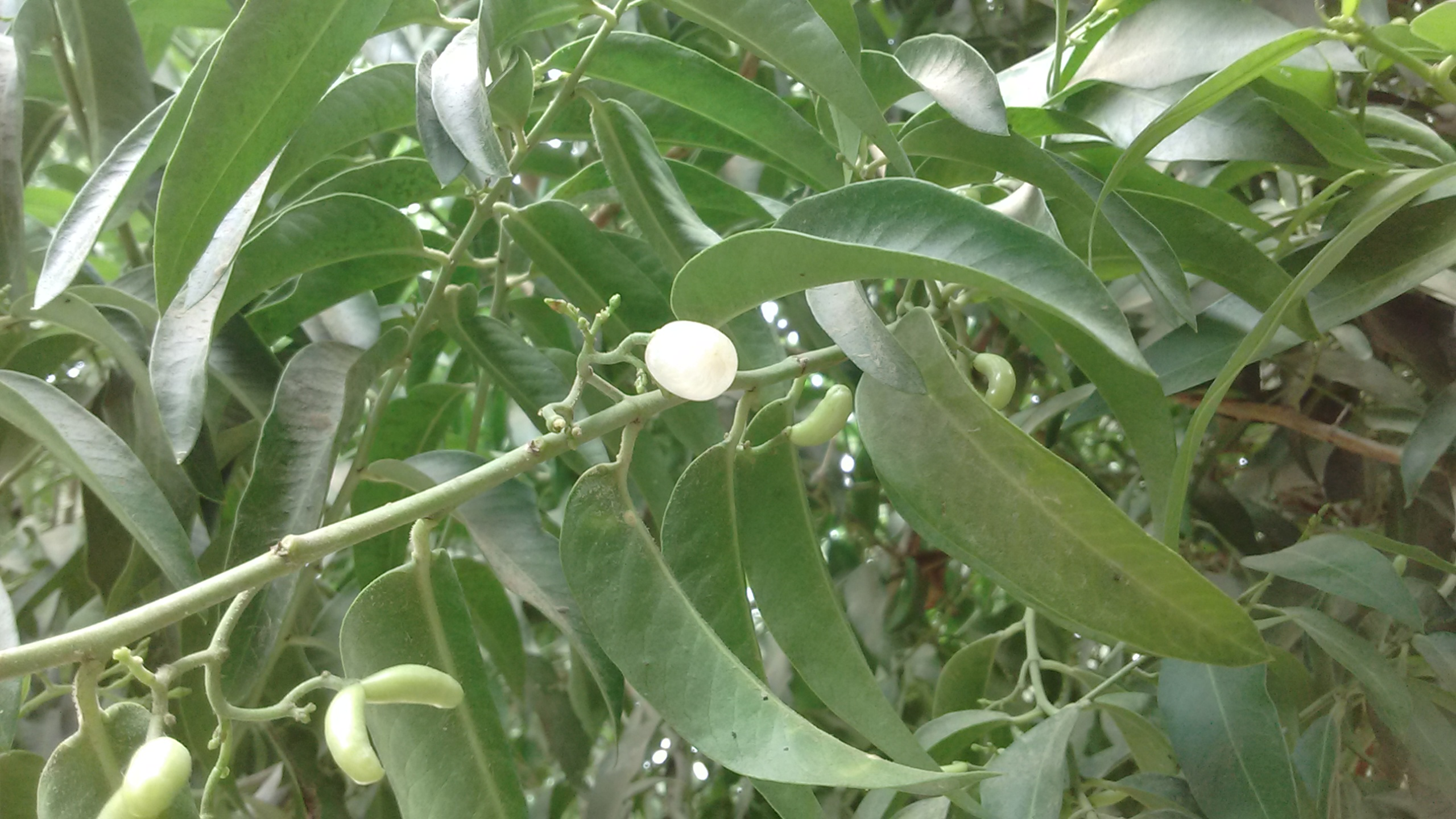
- Vallesia glabra

Scientific classification
- Kingdom: Plantae
- Clade: Tracheophytes
- Clade: Angiosperms
- Clade: Eudicots
- Clade: Asterids
- Order: Gentianales
- Family: Apocynaceae
- Subfamily: Rauvolfioideae
- Tribe: Aspidospermateae
- Genus: Vallesia; Ruiz & Pav.

= Vallesia =

Genus of plants

Vallesia is a genus of plants in the family Apocynaceae first described as a genus in 1794. It is native to South America, Central America, Mexico, Florida, the Galápagos Islands, and the West Indies.

Species

- Vallesia antillana Woodson - Cuba, Jamaica, Dominican Republic, Florida, Bahamas, Yucatán Peninsula
- Vallesia aurantiaca (M.Martens & Galeotti) J.F.Morales - C + S Mexico, Central America
- Vallesia baileyana Woodson - Sonora
- Vallesia conzattii Standl. - Oaxaca
- Vallesia glabra (Cav.) Link - Mexico; South America from Colombia to Paraguay
- Vallesia hypoglauca Ernst - Venezuela
- Vallesia laciniata Brandegee - Baja California
- Vallesia montana Urb. - Cuba, Hispaniola
- Vallesia pubescens Andersson - Galápagos
- Vallesia sinaloensis El.Mey. ex J.F.Morales - Sinaloa
- Vallesia spectabilis El.Mey. ex J.F.Morales - Jalisco
- Vallesia vaupesana J.F.Morales - Vaupes in Colombia

formerly included

Vallesia macrocarpa Hillebr. = Pteralyxia laurifolia (G.Lodd.) Leeuwenb.
