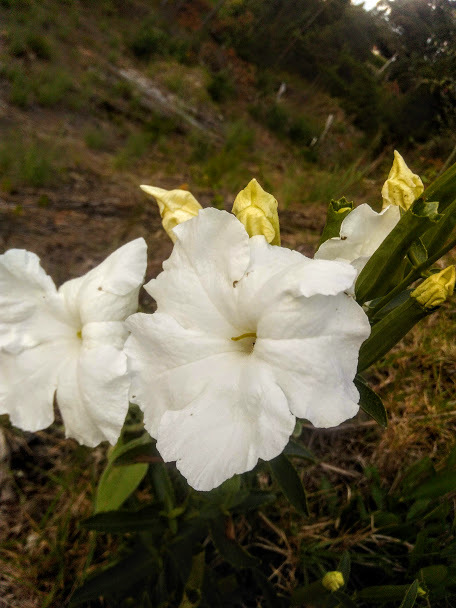
- Escobedia grandiflora

Scientific classification
- Kingdom: Plantae
- Clade: Tracheophytes
- Clade: Angiosperms
- Clade: Eudicots
- Clade: Asterids
- Order: Lamiales
- Family: Orobanchaceae
- Genus: Escobedia; Ruiz & Pav.

Synonyms
- Neosilvia Pax; Micalia Raf.; Silvia Vell.

= Escobedia =

Genus of flowering plants

Escobedia is a genus of flowering plants belonging to the family Orobanchaceae.

Its native range is from Mexico to Southern Tropical America. It is found in the countries of; Argentina, Belize, Bolivia, Brazil, Colombia, Costa Rica, Ecuador, Guatemala, Honduras, Mexico, Nicaragua, Panama, Paraguay, Peru and Venezuela.

The genus name of Escobedia is in honour of Jorge Escobedo y Alarcón (1743–1805), a Spanish lawyer and colonial administrator in Peru, and it was first described and published in Fl. Peruv. Prodr. on page 91 in 1794.

Known species:

- Escobedia brachydonta Pennell
- Escobedia crassipes Pennell
- Escobedia grandiflora (L.f.) Kuntze
- Escobedia guatemalensis Loes.
- Escobedia laevis Schltdl. & Cham.
- Escobedia michoacana E.Carranza & C.Medina
- Escobedia peduncularis Pennell
