= Olmedia =

Conservation status
- Least Concern (IUCN 3.1)

Scientific classification
- Kingdom: Plantae
- Clade: Tracheophytes
- Clade: Angiosperms
- Clade: Eudicots
- Clade: Rosids
- Order: Rosales
- Family: Moraceae
- Genus: Olmedia; Ruiz & Pav. (1794)
- Species: O. aspera

Binomial name
- Olmedia aspera Ruiz & Pav.

Synonyms
- Olmedia caucana Pittier (1912); Olmedia falcifolia Pittier (1912); Olmedia poeppigiana Klotzsch (1847), nom. illeg.; Trophis aurantiaca Herzog (1909); Trophis caucana (Pittier) C.C.Berg (1988)

Genus of flowering plants

Olmedia aspera is a species of flowering plant in the mulberry family, Moraceae. It is the sole species in genus Olmedia. It is a tree native to the tropical Americas, ranging from Nicaragua through Costa Rica and Panama to Colombia, Ecuador, Peru, Bolivia, and northern Brazil.
