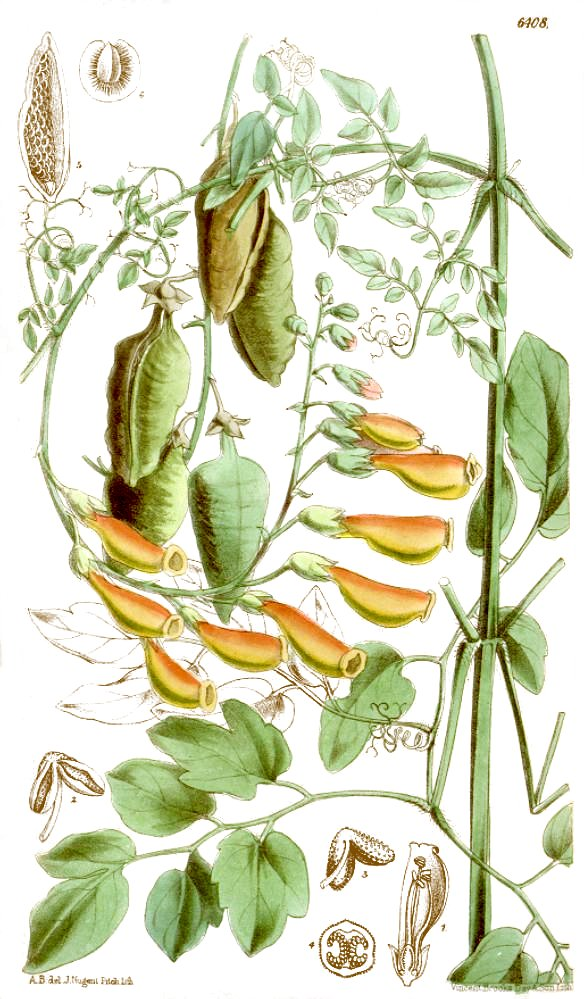
- Eccremocarpus scaber

Scientific classification
- Kingdom: Plantae
- Clade: Tracheophytes
- Clade: Angiosperms
- Clade: Eudicots
- Clade: Asterids
- Order: Lamiales
- Family: Bignoniaceae
- Tribe: Tourrettieae
- Genus: Eccremocarpus; Ruiz & Pav.

Species
- See text

Synonyms
- Calampelis D.Don

= Eccremocarpus =

Genus of plants

Eccremocarpus is a genus of five species of flowering plants in the family Bignoniaceae, native to western South America in Chile, western Argentina, and Peru. The species are evergreen semi-woody vines growing to 1–7 m tall.

It is also in Tribe Tourrettieae.

== Selected species ==
- Eccremocarpus longiflorus Humb. & Bonpl. Peru.
- Eccremocarpus scaber Ruiz & Pav. (Chilean glory flower) Chile, western Argentina.
- Eccremocarpus vargasianus Sandwith. Peru.

== Cultivation and uses ==
Eccremocarpus scaber is grown as an ornamental plant for its attractive tubular flowers. In cool temperate regions it is not winter hardy, and is often grown as an annual plant.
