= Calopteryx =

Calopteryx may refer to:

- Calopteryx (damselfly), a genus of damselflies in the family Calopterygidae
- Calopteryx, a genus of plants in the family Ericaceae, synonym of Thibaudia
