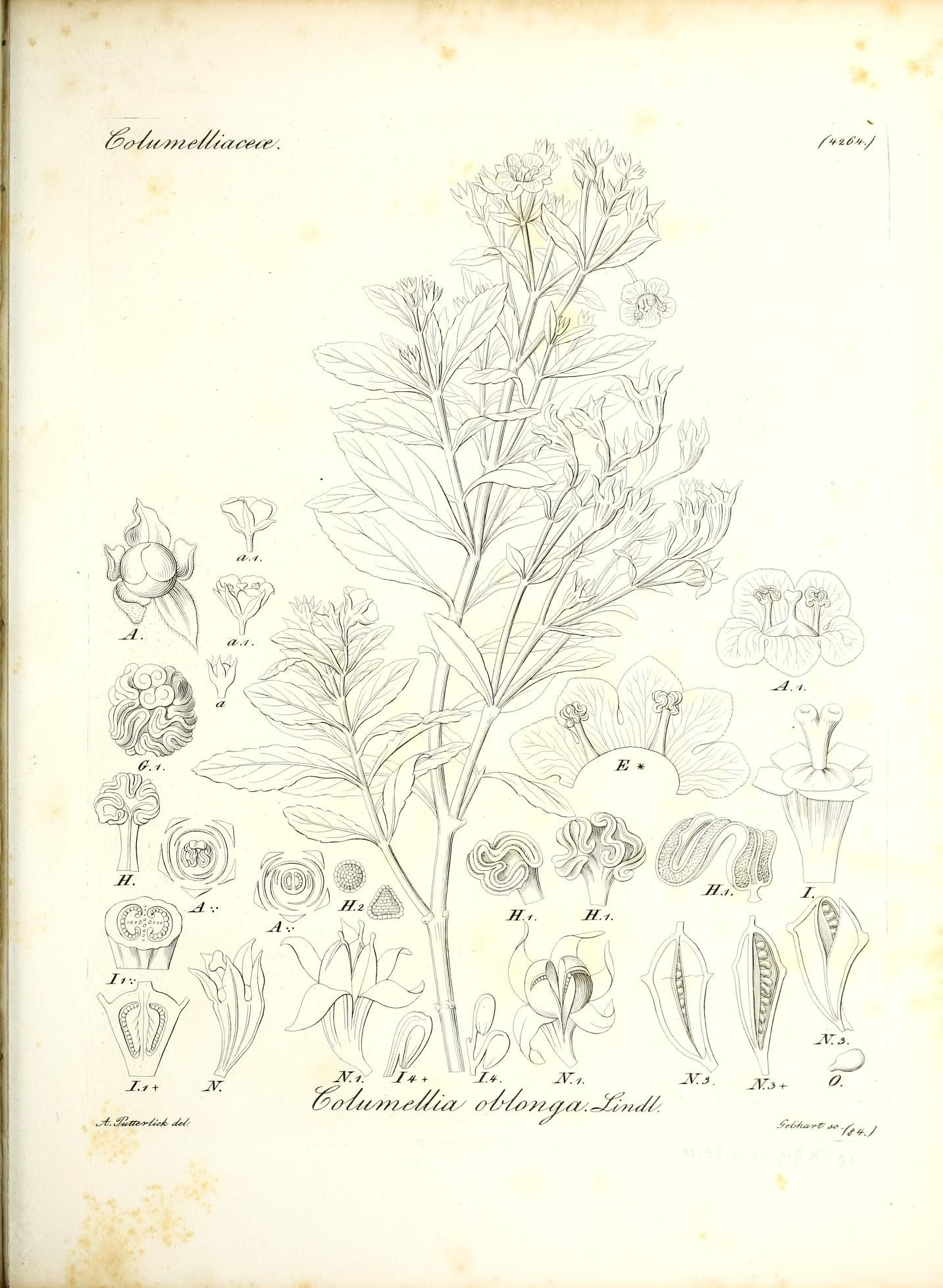
- Columellia oblonga

Scientific classification
- Kingdom: Plantae
- Clade: Tracheophytes
- Clade: Angiosperms
- Clade: Eudicots
- Clade: Asterids
- Order: Bruniales
- Family: Columelliaceae
- Genus: Columellia; Ruiz & Pav.

Type species
- Columellia oblonga Ruiz & Pav.

Synonyms
- Uluxia Juss.

= Columellia =

Genus of flowering plants

Columellia is a group of plant species in the Columelliaceae described as a genus in 1794.

Columellia is native to the Andes Mountains of western South America (Colombia, Ecuador, Peru, Bolivia).

Species

1. Columellia lucida Danguy & Cherm. - Colombia, Ecuador, N Peru
2. Columellia oblonga Ruiz & Pav. - Colombia, Ecuador, Peru, W Bolivia
3. Columellia obovata Ruiz & Pav. - S Ecuador, Peru
4. Columellia subsessilis Schltr. - Bolivia
5. Columellia weberbaueri Schltr. - Peru
