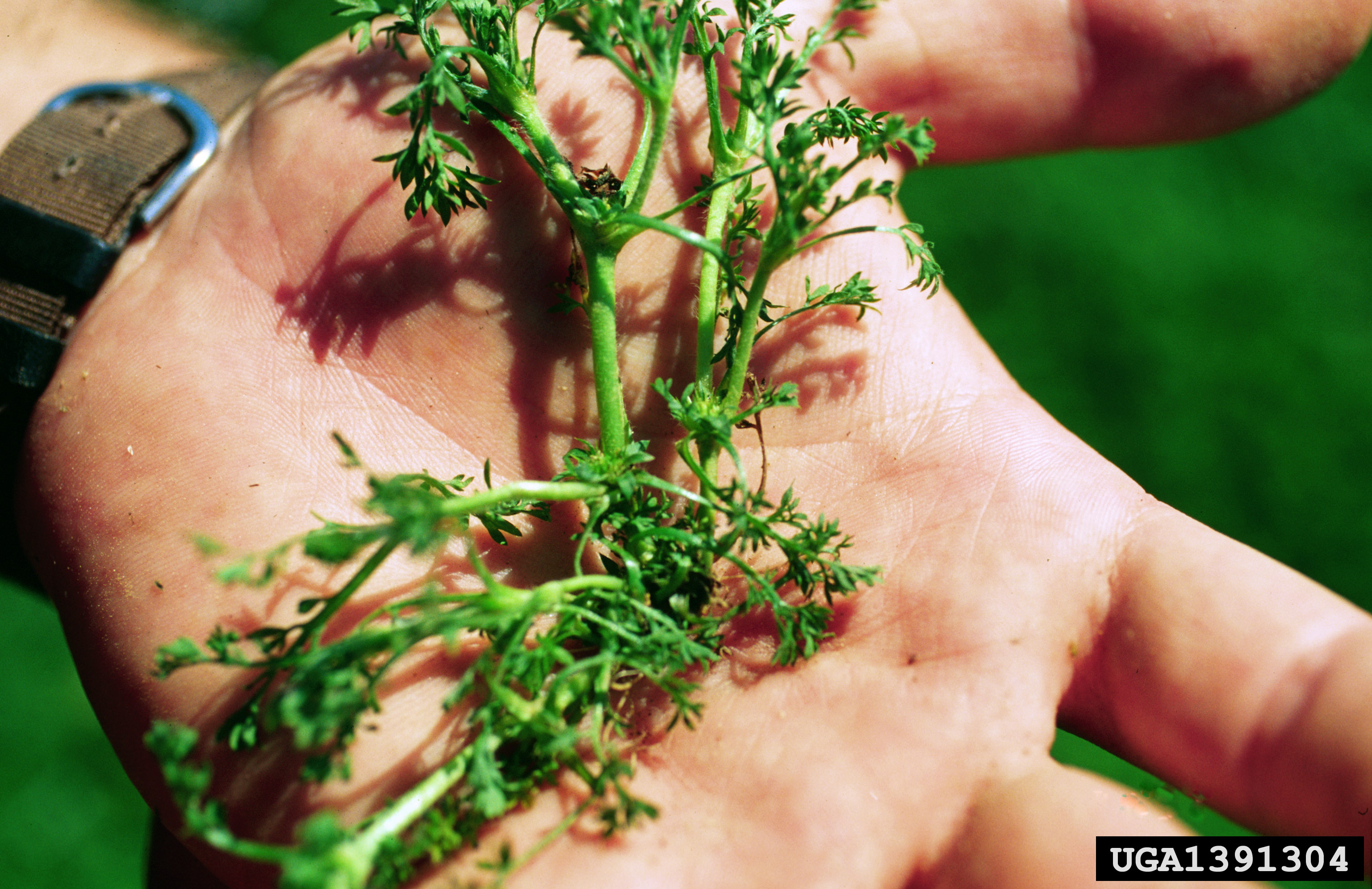
- Soliva sessilis

Scientific classification
- Kingdom: Plantae
- Clade: Embryophytes
- Clade: Tracheophytes
- Clade: Spermatophytes
- Clade: Angiosperms
- Clade: Eudicots
- Clade: Asterids
- Order: Asterales
- Family: Asteraceae
- Subfamily: Asteroideae
- Tribe: Anthemideae
- Genus: Soliva; Ruiz & Pav.

Type species
- Soliva sessilis Ruiz & Pav.

Synonyms
- Gymnostyles Juss.; Solivaea Cass.

= Soliva =

Genus of plants

Soliva is a genus of South American plants in the sunflower family. Burrweed is a common name for some species in this genus.

Species

- Soliva anthemidifolia (Juss.) Sweet - Colombia
- Soliva anthemifolia (Juss.) Sweet - Ecuador, Brazil, Paraguay, Uruguay
- Soliva macrocephala Cabrera - Uruguay, northern Argentina
- Soliva sessilis Ruiz & Pav. - Brazil, Paraguay, Uruguay, northern Argentina, Chile
- Soliva stolonifera (Brot.) R.Br. ex Sweet - Peru, Bolivia, Uruguay
- Soliva triniifolia Griseb. - Argentina
