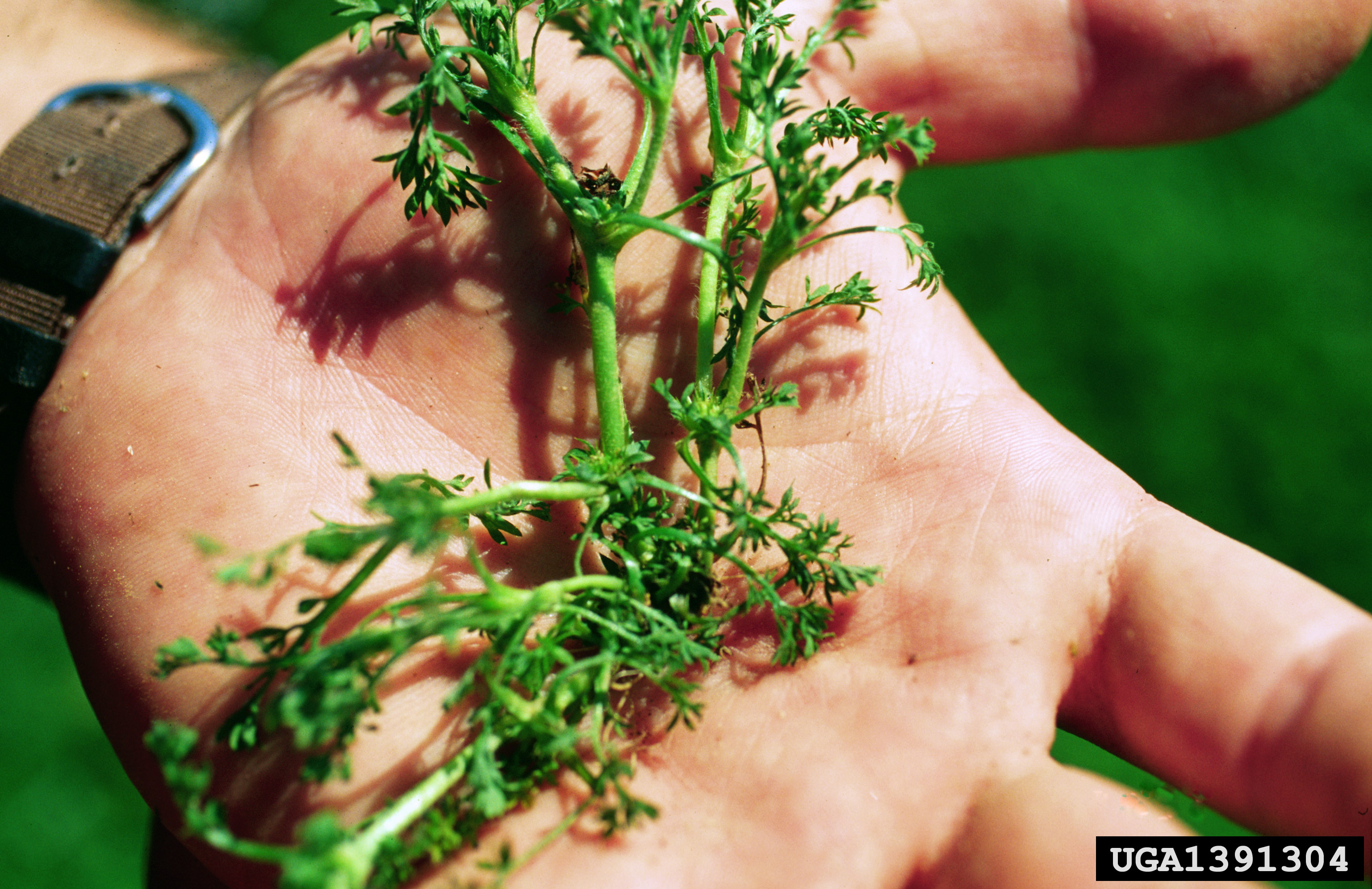

Scientific classification
- Kingdom: Plantae
- Clade: Embryophytes
- Clade: Tracheophytes
- Clade: Angiosperms
- Clade: Eudicots
- Clade: Asterids
- Order: Asterales
- Family: Asteraceae
- Genus: Soliva
- Species: S. sessilis

Binomial name
- Soliva sessilis Ruiz & Pav.

Synonyms
- Cotula sessilis (Ruiz & Pav.) Stace; Gymnostyles alata Spreng.; Gymnostyles barcklayana Steud.; Gymnostyles chilensis Spreng.; Gymnostyles pterosperma Juss.; Soliva alata DC.; Soliva barclayana DC.; Soliva daucifolia Nutt.; Soliva microloma Phil.; Soliva neglecta Cabrera; Soliva pterosperma (Juss.) Less.; Soliva sessilis var. barclayana (DC.) Baker; Soliva valdiviana Phil.; Ranunculus alatus Poir. ex All.

= Soliva sessilis =

Species of flowering plant

Soliva sessilis is a species of flowering plant in the family Asteraceae. It is one of up to nine species of the genus Soliva and is a low-growing, herbaceous annual plant. Its common names include field burrweed, Onehunga-weed, lawn burrweed, lawnweed, jo-jo weed and common soliva. It is one of several plants also known as bindi weed, bindii (also spelt bindi; /bɪn.di/), or bindi-eye.

This weedy plant is known for its tiny, sharp-needled seeds. It has small feathery leaves reminiscent of parsley and features exposed upward-pointing rosettes of seeds in a pod nestled at the branch junctions. Those familiar with the plant may also refer to it as "bindi patches", which cannot be easily walked on barefoot. Dogs and cats are similarly affected and tend to avoid areas where they have encountered it.

Originally native to South America, the plant is now well established in many places around the world, including Australia, New Zealand, southwest France, Hawaii, California, and several other states in the United States. It is mainly found in parks and ovals, though it has also become an invasive species in lawns in southeast US, Australia and New Zealand.

Bindi weed can be removed manually by pulling it out at the root, usually when it has grown large, and started to flower, and before seeding—especially after rain when the ground is softer. A hand tool that pinches the taproot and provides leverage to reach under the central core is the most effective method.

Bindi can be treated with herbicide. Late winter and early spring are the best times to destroy the weed before its seeds germinate. Effective herbicides are typically combinations of MCPA and dicamba, which target broad-leaved plants but not grasses. These chemicals have similar effects as natural plant auxins, and their increased concentrations cause unnatural plant growth that kills the plant. Mowing grass to a higher level will allow more competitive plants to thrive in the area. Bindi weed also favors compacted ground, so aerating the soil can help reduce its presence.
