= Lawnweed =

Lawnweed may refer to:

- Weeds of lawns
- Soliva sessilis, a weed of lawns
