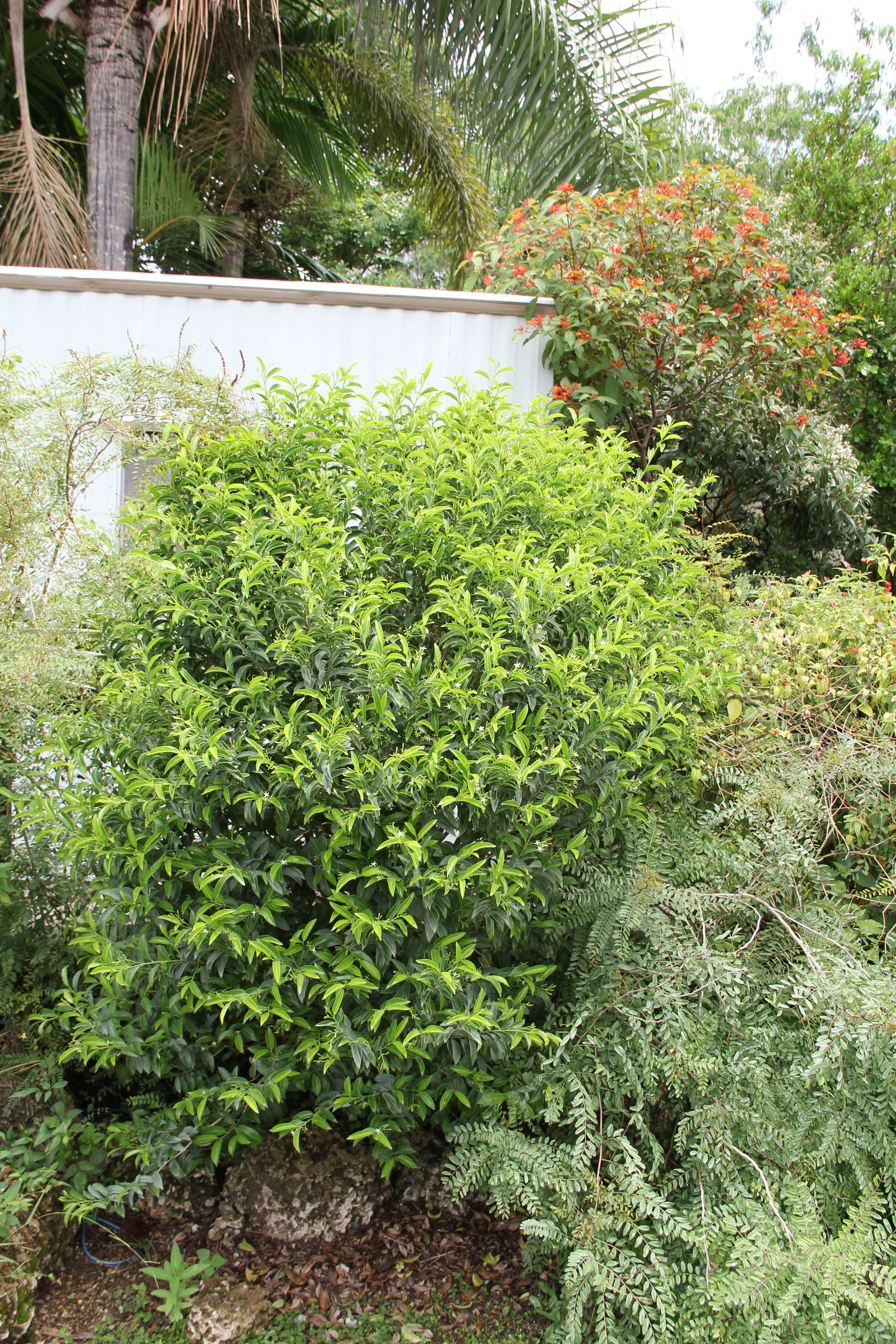
- Vallesia antillana

Scientific classification
- Kingdom: Plantae
- Clade: Tracheophytes
- Clade: Angiosperms
- Clade: Eudicots
- Clade: Asterids
- Order: Gentianales
- Family: Apocynaceae
- Genus: Vallesia
- Species: V. antillana

Binomial name
- Vallesia antillana Woodson, 1937

= Vallesia antillana =

Species of shrub

Vallesia antillana, common name pearl berry or tearshrub, is a flowering shrub that grows in The Bahamas, Greater Antilles, and Key West. A small population has also been found in Everglades National Park. The flowers do not have much fragrance. It is a perennial plant with white flowers and white fruit. It is in the family Apocynaceae.

It has been used in landscaping and thrives in partial sun. The fruit form is a nearly translucent drupe.
