= Sphaeradenia sanctae-barbarae =

Conservation status
- Near Threatened (IUCN 3.1)

Scientific classification
- Kingdom: Plantae
- Clade: Tracheophytes
- Clade: Angiosperms
- Clade: Monocots
- Order: Pandanales
- Family: Cyclanthaceae
- Genus: Sphaeradenia
- Species: S. sanctae-barbarae

Binomial name
- Sphaeradenia sanctae-barbarae Harling

Species of plant

Sphaeradenia sanctae-barbarae is a species of plant in the Cyclanthaceae family. It is endemic to Ecuador. Its natural habitat is subtropical or tropical moist montane forests.
