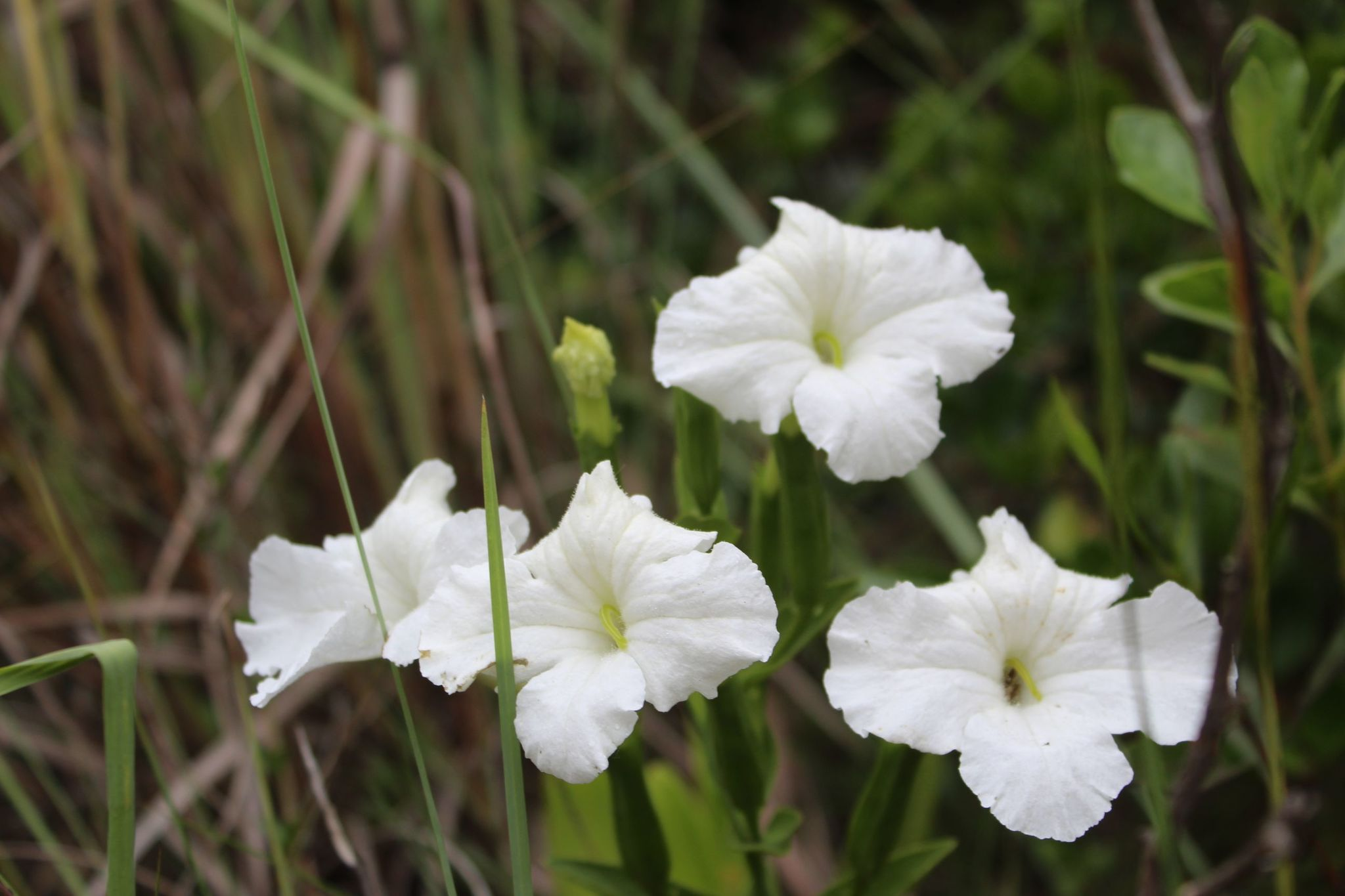

Scientific classification
- Kingdom: Plantae
- Clade: Embryophytes
- Clade: Tracheophytes
- Clade: Angiosperms
- Clade: Eudicots
- Clade: Asterids
- Order: Lamiales
- Family: Orobanchaceae
- Genus: Escobedia
- Species: E. grandiflora

Binomial name
- Escobedia grandiflora (L.f.) Kuntze

Synonyms
- Buchnera grandiflora L. f.; Escobedia brevipes Pennell; Escobedia curialis (Vell.) Pennell; Escobedia foliolosa Pennell; Escobedia longiflora Pennell; Escobedia obtusifolia Pennell; Escobedia parimensis Pennell; Escobedia reticulata Pennell; Escobedia scabrifolia Ruiz & Pav.; Escobedia scabrifolia var. laevigata J.A.Schmidt; Escobedia silvia Steud.; Micalia grandiflora (L. f.) Raf.; Silvia curialis Vell.

= Escobedia grandiflora =

Species of flowering plant

Escobedia grandiflora is a plant in the family Orobanchaceae.

== Description ==
An erect herb, an obligate hemiparasite of roots of a variety of plants, including the families Asteraceae, Cyperaceae, Melastomataceae, but with a special preference for species of the family Poaceae. It has opposite, sessile, lanceolate leaves with an acute apex and a rough consistency. The flowers are axillary, long-pedicelled, large, and white. Its roots arise from the base of the stem, are cylindrical, and orange in color. As a hemiparasitic plant, it forms haustoria to attach to its hosts.

There are historical records describing a high abundance of this species in the American tropics when the colonizers arrived; there are also records of its use as a food dye and medicinal plant. This use prevailed in farming communities until the end of the last century when it was replaced by synthetic dyes and more abundant plants. Currently, natural populations of E. grandiflora have decreased dramatically, and it is necessary to assess its conservation status.

== Distribution ==
E. grandiflora is distributed in the Americas, in the following countries: Argentina, Bolivia, Brazil, Colombia, Costa Rica, Ecuador, Guatemala, Mexico, Panama, Paraguay, Peru, and Venezuela.

== Components ==
The root contains an active ingredient, azafrin, a carotenoid with great vitaminic power (Vit. A), which produces the orange color, and it also contains tannins. Unfortunately, although this species has been of ancestral importance in the American continent, it has not been well studied in its ecological requirements, chemical composition, medicinal use, among other aspects.

== Uses ==
American communities use the roots as a seasoning, to color food, and as medicine. This species is often confused with turmeric (Curcuma longa), which is an introduced species to the American continent to which it has adapted well. In the industry, it is used to color cheese, margarine, and butter. Popularly, it is used against jaundice, hepatitis, and liver diseases.

== Common names ==
Among its common names are: root saffron, beard saffron, palillo, Andean saffron, color. In Peru, it is called mountain saffron, mountain spice, and mountain spice.

== Ecology ==
A study conducted in grasslands in Brazil revealed significant disparities in species composition, with quadrants inhabited by Escobedia grandiflora showing higher species richness, an increase in Shannon's diversity, and greater Pielou's evenness, extending across various functional groups. Furthermore, the presence of Escobedia grandiflora correlated with a notable reduction in the percentage of dominance of plant species within the observed grasslands. These findings highlight a discernible association between the neotropical hemiparasite and the structural dynamics of grassland plant communities, indicating higher plant diversity and changes in dominance in its presence.
