= Tendril =

Specialisation of plant parts used to climb or bind

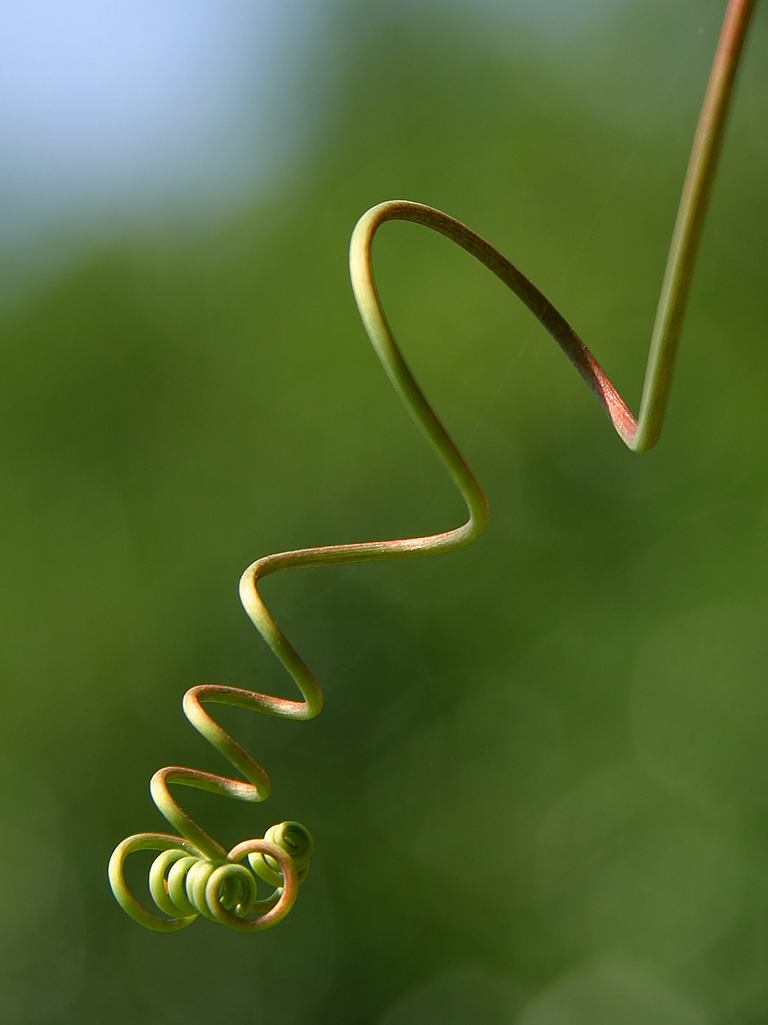
A curling tendril

In botany, a tendril is a specialized stem, leaf or petiole with a thread-like shape used by climbing plants for support and attachment, as well as cellular invasion by parasitic plants such as Cuscuta. There are many plants that have tendrils; including sweet peas, passionflower, grapes and the Chilean glory-flower. Tendrils respond to touch and to chemical factors by curling, twining, or adhering to suitable structures or hosts. Tendrils vary greatly in size from a few centimeters up to 27 inches (69 centimeters) for Nepenthes harryana. The chestnut vine (Tetrastigma voinierianum) can have tendrils up to 20.5 inches (52 centimeters) in length. Normally there is only one simple or branched tendril at each node (see plant stem), but the aardvark cucumber (Cucumis humifructus) can have as many as eight.

== History ==
The earliest and most comprehensive study of tendrils was Charles Darwin's monograph On the Movements and Habits of Climbing Plants, which was originally published in 1865. This work also coined the term circumnutation to describe the motion of growing stems and tendrils seeking supports. Darwin also observed the phenomenon now known as tendril perversion, in which tendrils adopt the shape of two sections of counter-twisted helices with a transition in the middle.

== Biology of tendrils ==
In the garden pea, it is only the terminal leaflets that are modified to become tendrils. In other plants such as the yellow vetch (Lathyrus aphaca), the whole leaf is modified to become tendrils while the stipules become enlarged and carry out photosynthesis. Still others use the rachis of a compound leaf as a tendril, such as members of the genus Clematis.

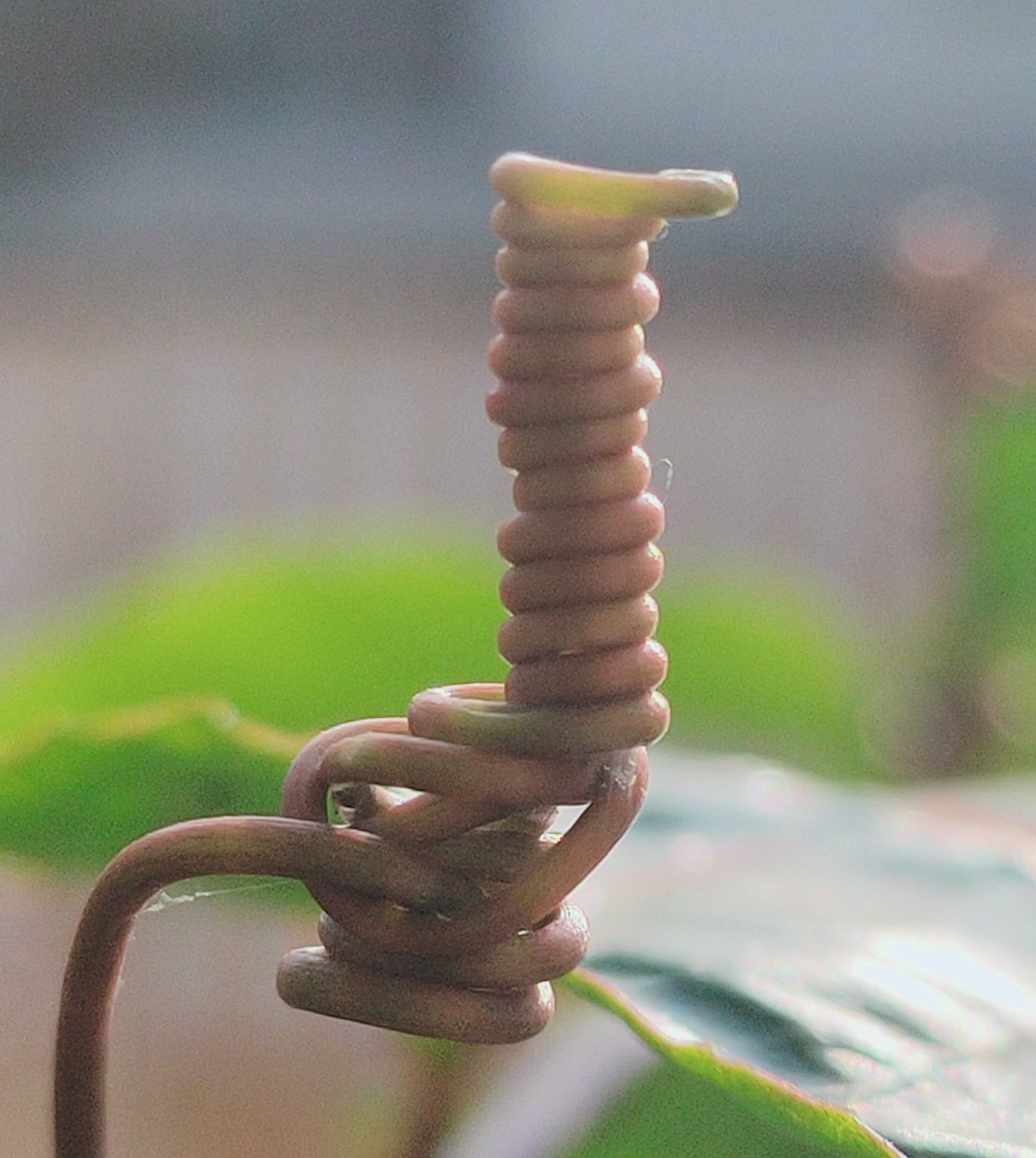
Tendril of a common climbing plant

The specialised pitcher traps of Nepenthes plants form on the end of tendrils. The tendrils of aerial pitchers are usually coiled in the middle. If the tendril comes into contact with an object for long enough it will usually curl around it, forming a strong anchor point for the pitcher. In this way, the tendrils help to support the growing stem of the plant. Tendrils of Cuscuta, a parasitic plant, are guided by airborne chemicals, and only twine around suitable hosts.

=== Evolution and species ===
Climbing habits in plants support themselves to reach the canopy in order to receive more sunlight resources and increase the diversification in flowering plants. Tendrils are a plant organ that is derived from various morphological structures such as stems, leaves and inflorescences. Even though climbing habits are involved in the angiosperms, gymnosperms, and ferns, tendrils are often shown in angiosperms and little in ferns. Based on their molecular basis of tendril development, studies showed that tendrils' helical growth performance is not correlated with ontogenetic origin, instead, there are multiple ontogenetic origins. 17 types of tendrils have been identified by their ontogenetic origins and growth pattern, and each type of tendril can be involved more than once within angiosperms. Common fruits and vegetables that have tendrils includes watermelon (Citrullus lanatus)'s derived from modified stem, pea (Pisum sativum)'s derived from modified terminal leaflets and common grape vine (Vitis vinifera)'s is modified from whole inflorescence.

== Coiling mechanism ==
=== Circumnutation ===
The mechanism of tendril coiling begins with circumnutation of the tendril in which it is moving and growing in a circular oscillatory pattern around its axis. Circumnutation is often defined as the first main movement of the tendril, and it serves the purpose of increasing the chance that the plant will come in contact with a support system (physical structure for the tendril to coil around). In a 2019 study done by Guerra et al., it was shown that without a support stimulus, in this case a stake in the ground, the tendrils will circumnutate towards a light stimulus. After many attempts to reach a support structure, the tendril will eventually fall to the ground. However, it was found that when a support stimulus is present, the tendril's circumnutation oscillation occurs in the direction of the support stimulus. Therefore, it was concluded that tendrils are able to change the direction of their circumnutation based on the presence of a support stimulus. The process of circumnutation in plants is not unique to tendril plants, as almost all plant species show circumnutation behaviors.

=== Contact coiling ===
Thigmotropism is the basis of the input signal in the tendril coiling mechanism. For example, pea tendrils have highly sensitive cells in the surfaces of cell walls that are exposed. These sensitized cells are the ones that initiate the thigmotropic signal, typically as a calcium wave. The primary touch signal induces a signaling cascade of other phytohormones, most notably gamma-Aminobutyric acid (GABA) and Jasmonate (JA). In grapevine tendrils, it recently has been shown that GABA can independently promote tendril coiling. It has also been shown that jasmonate phytohormones serve as a hormonal signal to initiate tendril coiling. This cascade can activate plasma membrane H+-ATPase, which also plays a role in the contact coiling mechanism as a proton pump. This pump activity establishes an electrochemical of H+ ions from inside the cell to the apoplast, which in turn creates an osmotic gradient. This leads to loss of turgor pressure; the differences in cell size due to the loss of turgor pressure in some cells creates the coiling response. This contractile movement is also influenced by gelatinous fibers, which contract and lignify in response to the thigmotropic signal cascade.

=== Self-discrimination ===
Although tendrils twine around hosts based on touch perception, plants have a form of self-discrimination and avoid twining around themselves or neighboring plants of the same species – demonstrating chemotropism based on chemoreception. Once a tendril comes in contact with a neighboring conspecific plant (of the same species) signaling molecules released by the host plant bind to chemoreceptors on the climbing plant's tendrils. This generates a signal that prevents the thigmotropic pathway and therefore prevents the tendril from coiling around that host.

Studies confirming this pathway have been performed on the climbing plant Cayratia japonica. Research demonstrated that when two C. japonica plants were placed in physical contact, the tendrils would not coil around the conspecific plant. Researchers tested this interaction by isolating oxalate crystals from the leaves of a C. japonica plant and coating a stick with the oxalate crystals. The tendrils of C. japonica plants that came in physical contact with the oxalate-coated stick would not coil, confirming that climbing plants use chemoreception for self-discrimination.

Self-discrimination may confer an evolutionary advantage for climbing plants to avoid coiling around conspecific plants. This is because neighboring climbing plants do not provide as stable of structures to coil around when compared to more rigid nearby plants. Furthermore, by being able to recognize and avoid coiling around conspecific plants, the plants reduce their proximity to competition, allowing them to have access to more resources and therefore better growth.

== Gallery ==
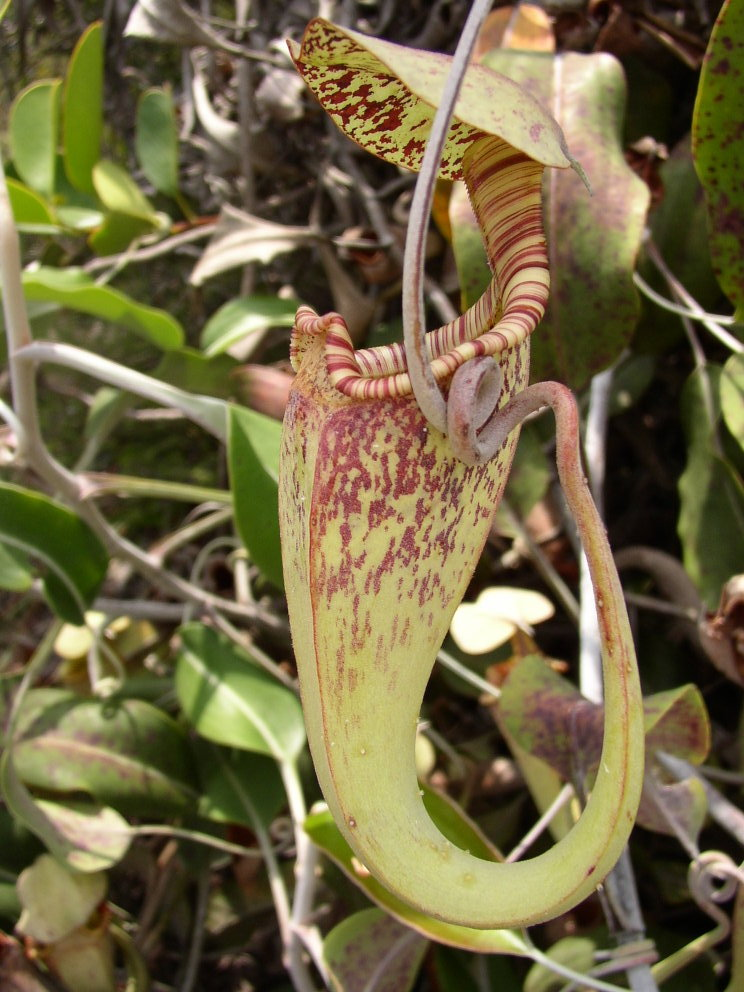
Nepenthes rafflesiana upper pitcher with coiled tendril.

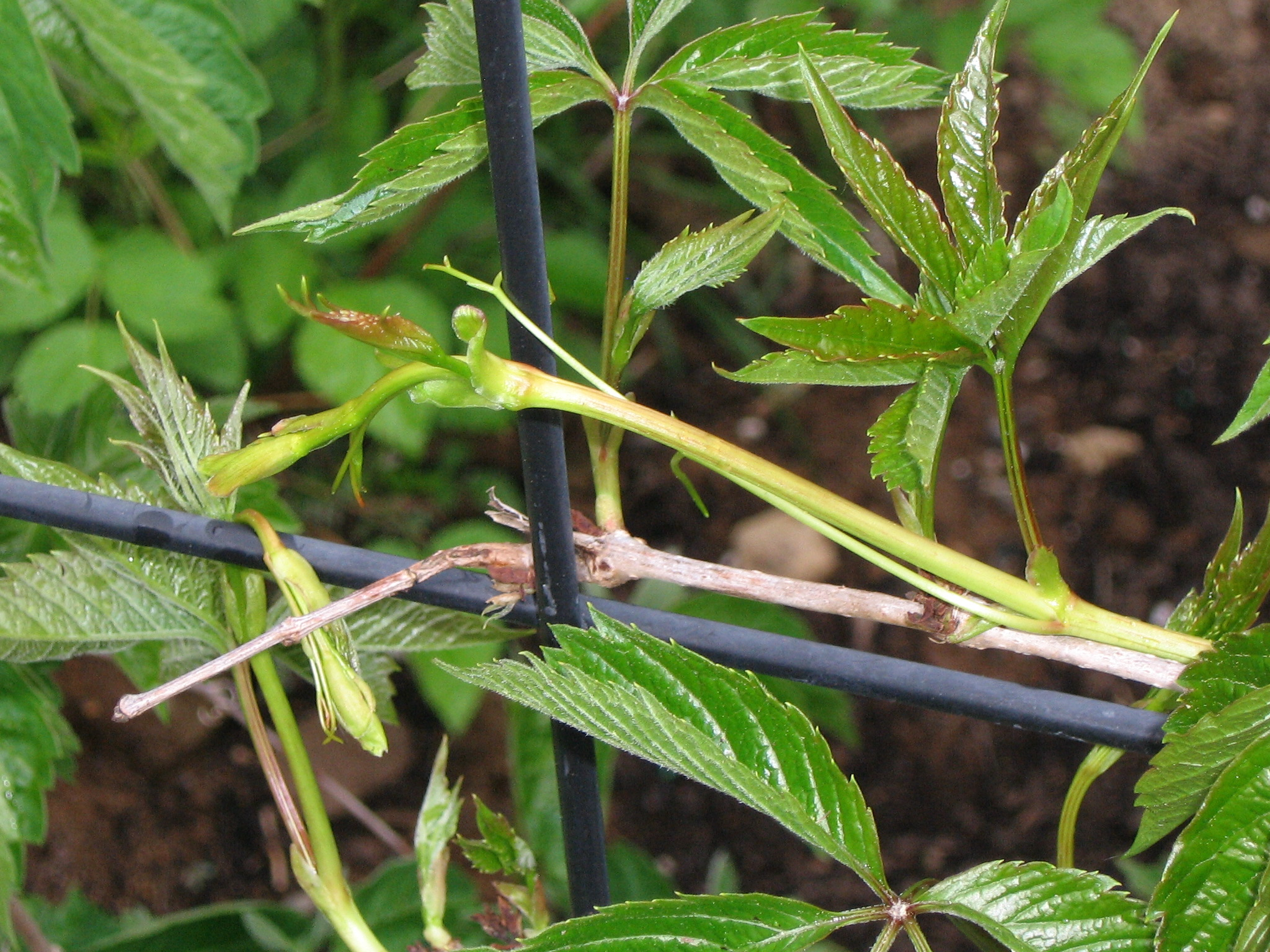
Virginia creeper vine beginning tendril

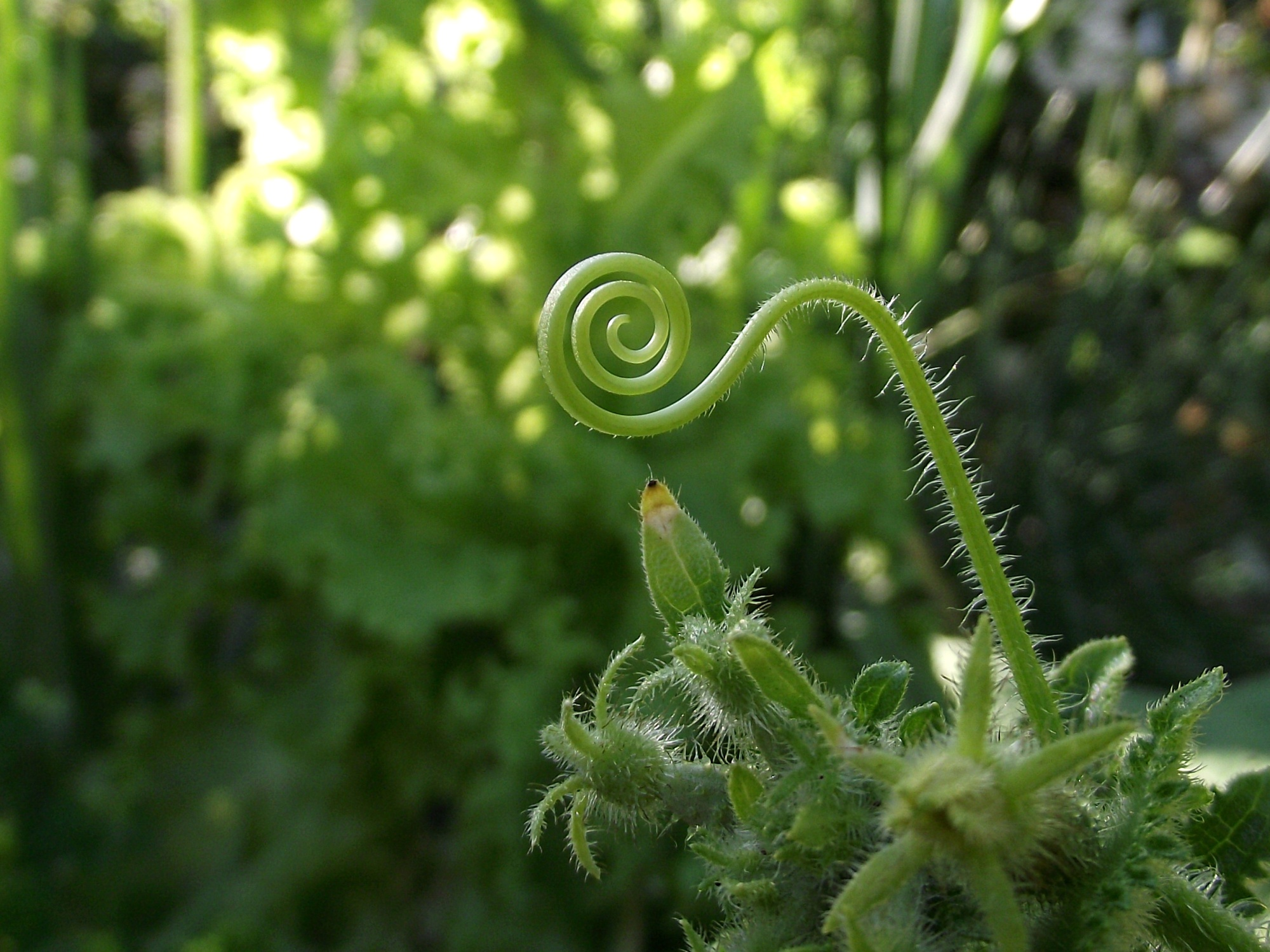
Cucumber tendril

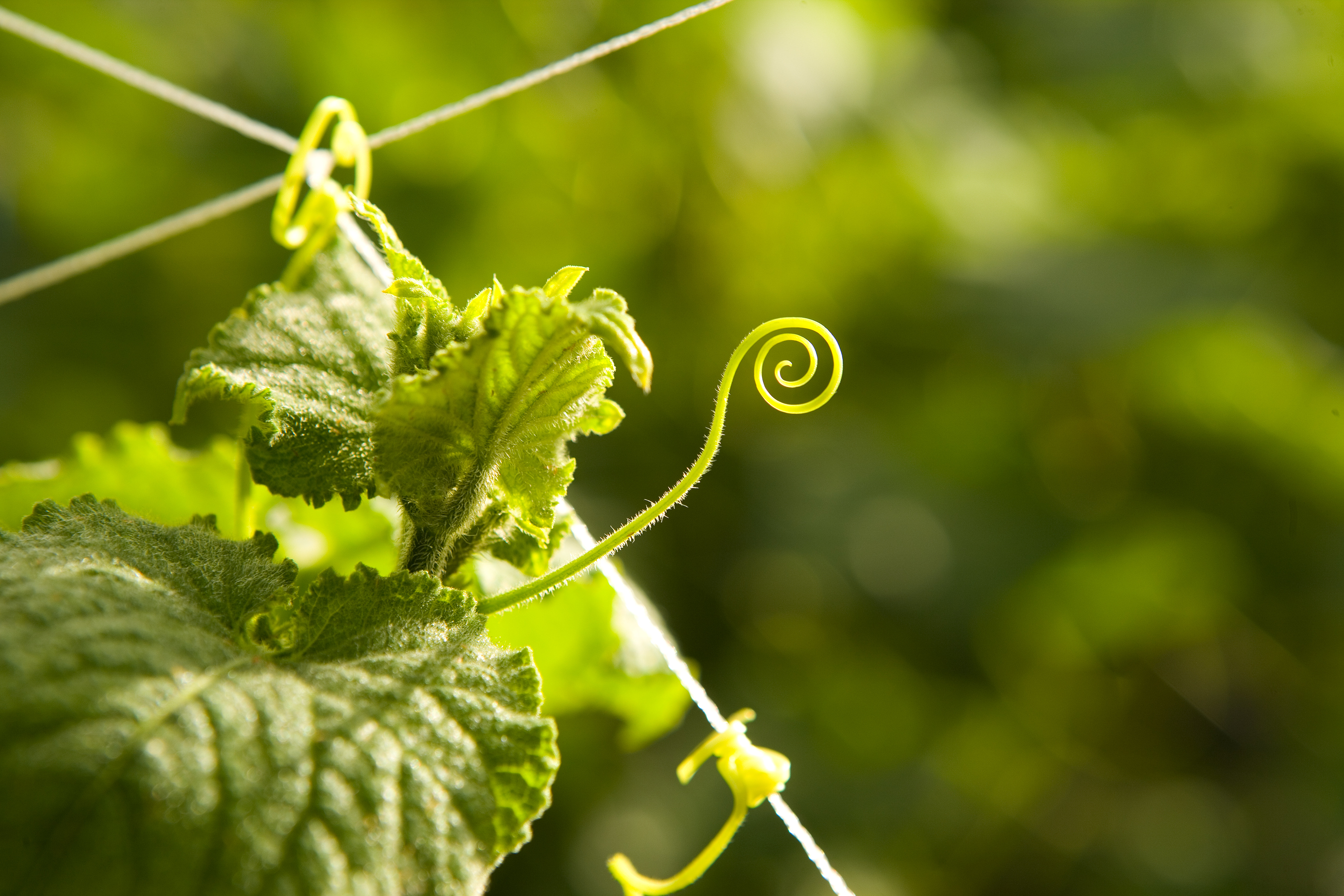
Squash vine coiled tendril
