= Sphaeradenia brachiolata =

Conservation status
- Vulnerable (IUCN 3.1)

Scientific classification
- Kingdom: Plantae
- Clade: Tracheophytes
- Clade: Angiosperms
- Clade: Monocots
- Order: Pandanales
- Family: Cyclanthaceae
- Genus: Sphaeradenia
- Species: S. brachiolata

Binomial name
- Sphaeradenia brachiolata R.Erikss.

Species of flowering plant

Sphaeradenia brachiolata is a species of plant in the Cyclanthaceae family. It is endemic to Ecuador. Its natural habitats are subtropical or tropical dry forests and subtropical or tropical moist montane forests.
