= Sphaeradenia chiriquensis =

Scientific classification
- Kingdom: Plantae
- Clade: Tracheophytes
- Clade: Angiosperms
- Clade: Monocots
- Order: Pandanales
- Family: Cyclanthaceae
- Genus: Sphaeradenia
- Species: S. chiriquensis

Binomial name
- Sphaeradenia chiriquensis Harling

Species of plant

Sphaeradenia chiriquensis is a species of plant in the family Cyclanthaceae that is native to Panama and Costa Rica. This palm-like plant is remarkable for its inflorescence, a spadix, in which the male and female flowers alternate in a precise checkerboard pattern. It is a semiepiphytic herbaceous plant of the montane rainforests. It was described by Harling in 1958.
