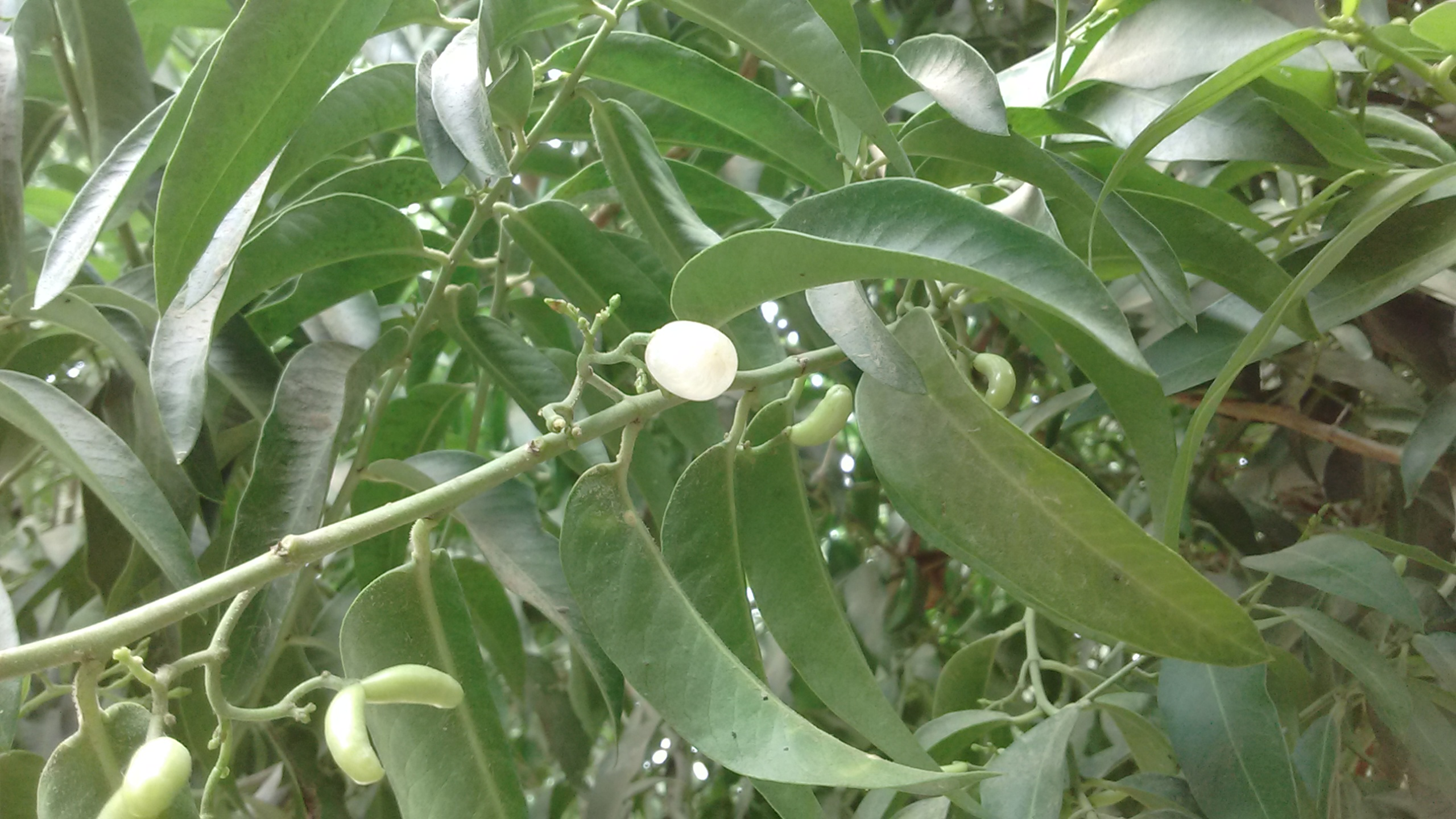
- Leaves and fruit

Conservation status
- Least Concern (IUCN 3.1)

Scientific classification
- Kingdom: Plantae
- Clade: Tracheophytes
- Clade: Angiosperms
- Clade: Eudicots
- Clade: Asterids
- Order: Gentianales
- Family: Apocynaceae
- Genus: Vallesia
- Species: V. glabra

Binomial name
- Vallesia glabra (Cav.) Link
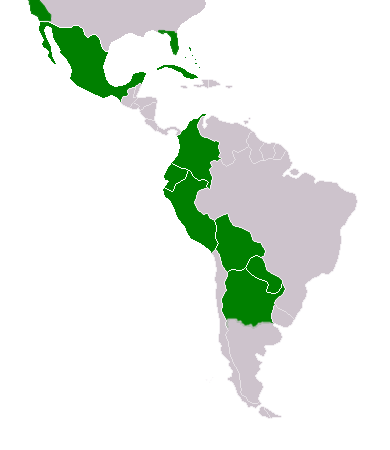
- Distribution map

Synonyms
- Rauvolfia glabra; Vallesia antillana; Vallesia chiococcoides; Vallesia cymbifolia; Vallesia dichotoma; Vallesia glabra var. pubescens; Vallesia inedita; Vallesia punctata

= Vallesia glabra =

Species of shrub

Vallesia glabra, commonly known as the pearlberry, is a species of shrub in the family Apocynaceae native to the tropical Americas. It is also known as smooth vallesia and tear shrub.

== Characteristics ==
Vallesia glabra produces small, white, berry-like fruits that resemble pearls, giving rise to the common name "pearlberry". The fruits are consumed by various bird species, and the plant provides shelter and shade within its habitat.

== Growth ==
The shrub typically grows to a height of 2–6 metres (6 ft 6 in to 19 ft 8 in).

== Habitat ==
The species typically grows in tropical and subtropical environments, including coastal areas, scrublands, and open woodlands.

== Distribution ==
Vallesia glabra is found in Mexico, Colombia, Ecuador (including the Galapagos Islands), Peru, Bolivia, Argentina, Paraguay, the Bahamas, Cuba, and the United States, where it is native to Florida and introduced in California.
