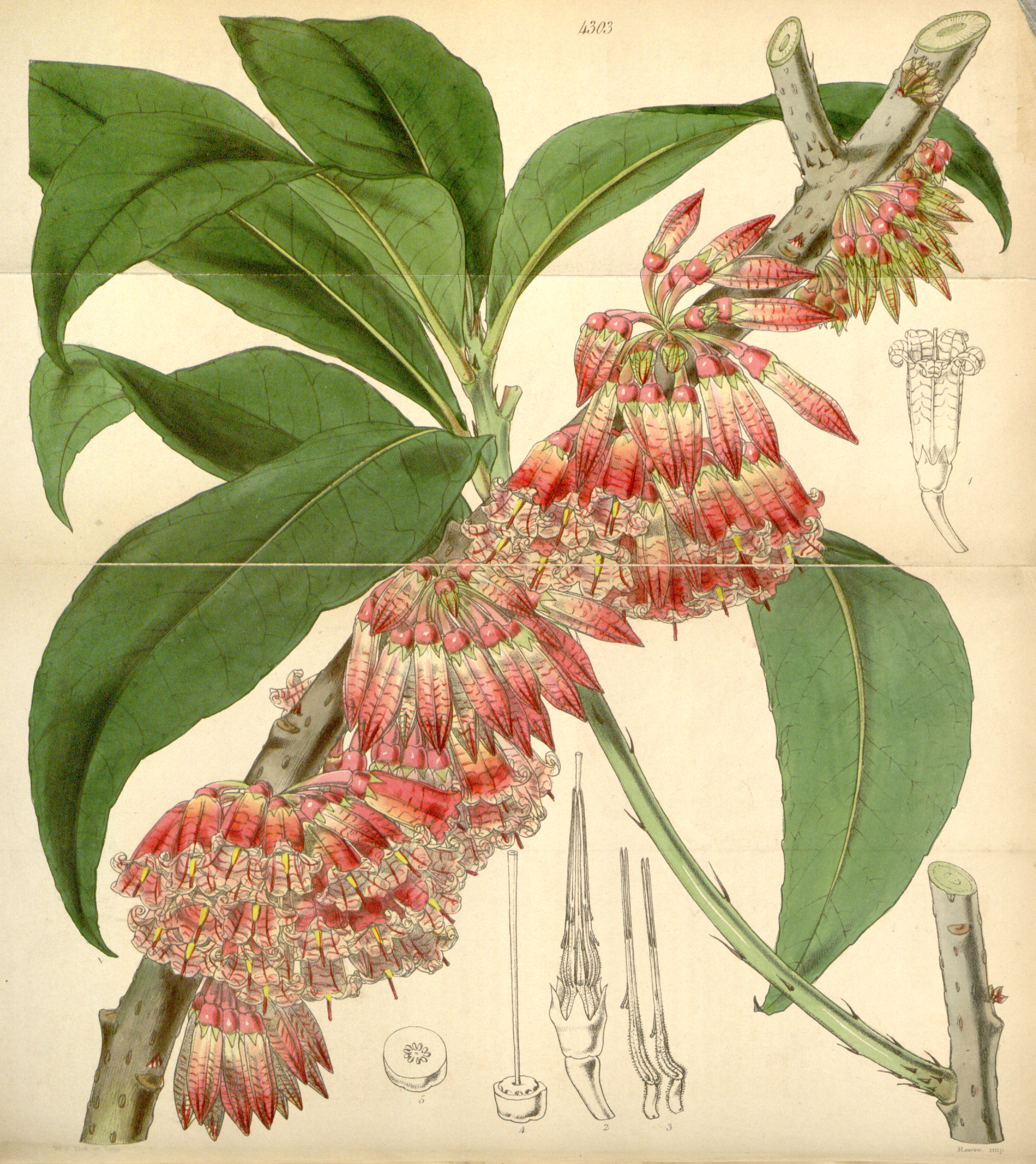
- Thibaudia (picture from Curtis's Botanical Magazine)

Scientific classification
- Kingdom: Plantae
- Clade: Tracheophytes
- Clade: Angiosperms
- Clade: Eudicots
- Clade: Asterids
- Order: Ericales
- Family: Ericaceae
- Subfamily: Vaccinioideae
- Tribe: Vaccinieae
- Genus: Thibaudia; Ruiz & Pav.

= Thibaudia =

Genus of flowering plants

Thibaudia is a genus of flowering plants in the family Ericaceae. They are native to Central and South America with a high concentration of species in the cloud forests of Costa Rica and Ecuador. Species of the genus are known commonly as zagalitas.

There are about 60 to 75 species.

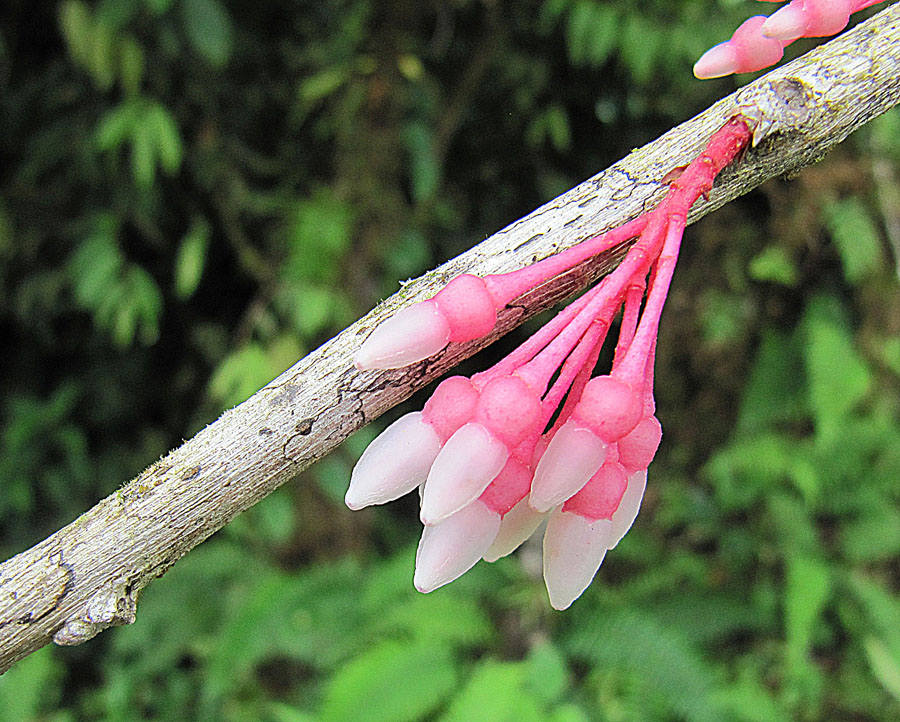
Thibaudia costaricensis

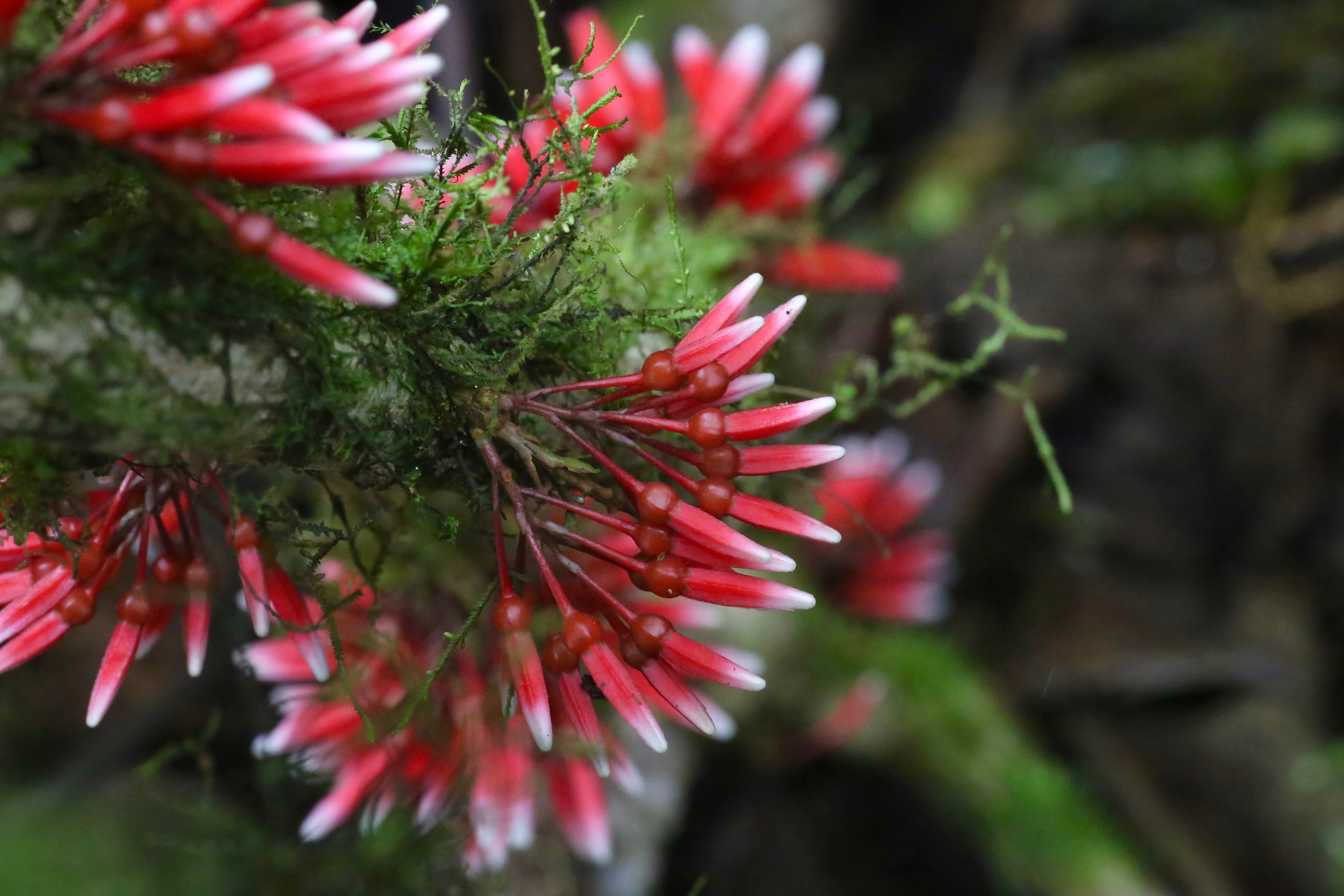
Thibaudia inflata

Species include:

- Thibaudia acacioides
- Thibaudia albiflora
- Thibaudia andrei
- Thibaudia angustifolia
- Thibaudia anomala
- Thibaudia apophysata
- Thibaudia archeri
- Thibaudia ardisiifolia
- Thibaudia biflora
- Thibaudia breweri
- Thibaudia cardenasii
- Thibaudia cardiophylla
- Thibaudia carrenoi
- Thibaudia caulialata
- Thibaudia clivalis
- Thibaudia costaricensis
- Thibaudia densiflora
- Thibaudia diphylla
- Thibaudia engleriana
- Thibaudia falconensis
- Thibaudia fallax
- Thibaudia floribunda
- Thibaudia gunnarii
- Thibaudia harlingii
- Thibaudia inflata
- Thibaudia insignis
- Thibaudia jahnii
- Thibaudia jorgensenii
- Thibaudia lanata
- Thibaudia lugoi
- Thibaudia macrocalyx
- Thibaudia martiniana
- Thibaudia mellifera
- Thibaudia nervosa
- Thibaudia parvifolia
- Thibaudia pennellii
- Thibaudia rigidiflora
- Thibaudia sessiliflora
- Thibaudia smithiana
- Thibaudia spathulata
- Thibaudia steyermarkii
- Thibaudia tomentosa
- Thibaudia truncata
- Thibaudia ulei
- Thibaudia uniflora
- Thibaudia urbaniana
