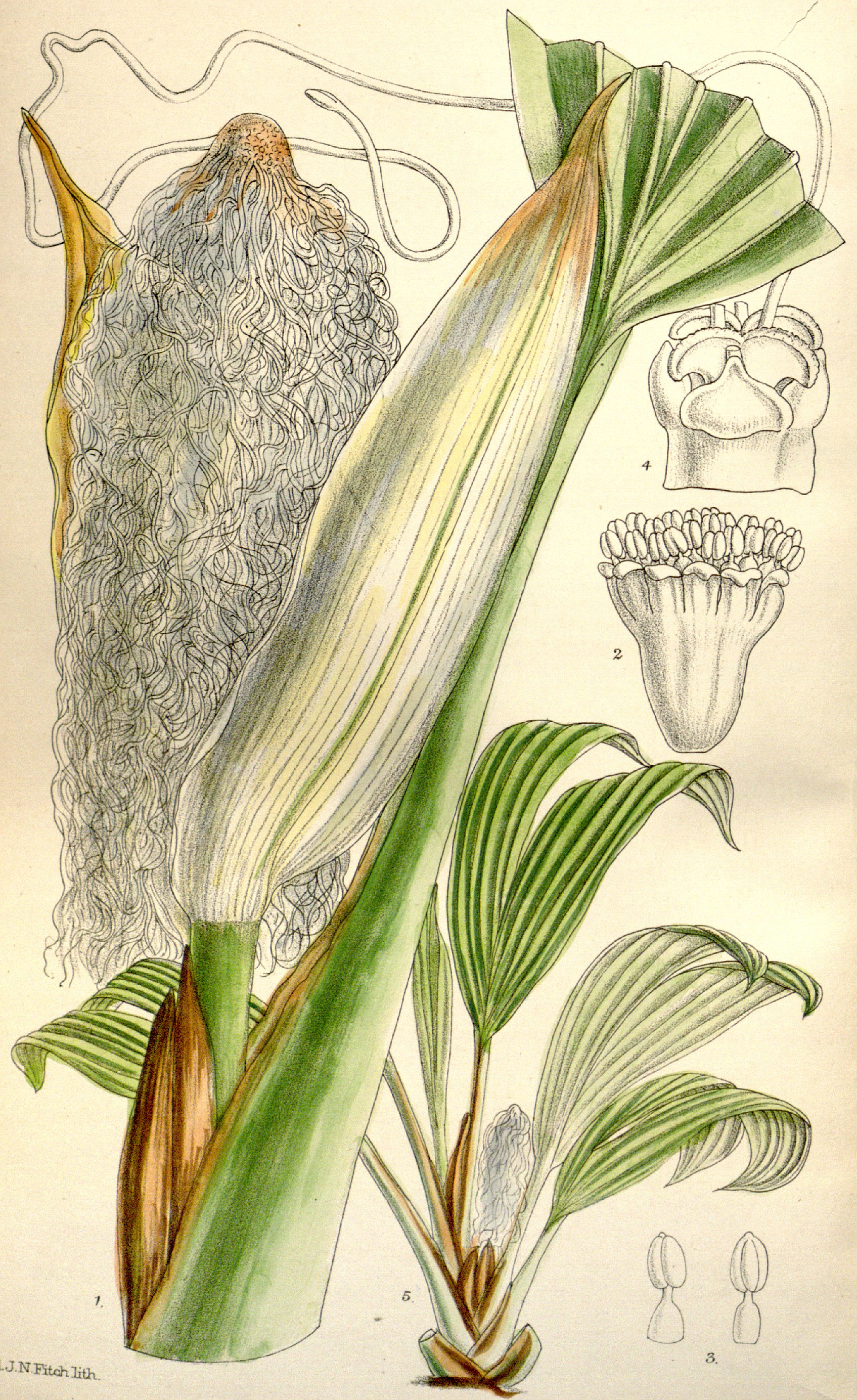
- Sphaeradenia laucheana

Scientific classification
- Kingdom: Plantae
- Clade: Tracheophytes
- Clade: Angiosperms
- Clade: Monocots
- Order: Pandanales
- Family: Cyclanthaceae
- Genus: Sphaeradenia; Harling

Synonyms
- Pseudoludovia Harling

= Sphaeradenia =

Genus of plants

Sphaeradenia is a genus of plant in family Cyclanthaceae, first described as a genus in 1954. It is native to Central America and South America.

Species

- Sphaeradenia acutitepala - from Nicaragua to Colombia
- Sphaeradenia alba - Panama
- Sphaeradenia alleniana - Costa Rica, Panama
- Sphaeradenia amazonica - Colombia, Venezuela, NW Brazil
- Sphaeradenia angustifolia - Peru
- Sphaeradenia asplundii - Ecuador
- Sphaeradenia brachiolata - Ecuador
- Sphaeradenia buenaventurae - Colombia
- Sphaeradenia carnosa - Colombia
- Sphaeradenia chiriquensis - Costa Rica, Panama
- Sphaeradenia columnaris - Colombia
- Sphaeradenia compacta - Colombia
- Sphaeradenia crassiceps - Peru
- Sphaeradenia crocea - Costa Rica, Panama, Colombia
- Sphaeradenia cuatrecasana - Colombia
- Sphaeradenia danielii - Colombia
- Sphaeradenia distans - Colombia
- Sphaeradenia duidae - Venezuela, NW Brazil
- Sphaeradenia fosbergii - Colombia
- Sphaeradenia garciae - Costa Rica, Panama, Colombia, Ecuador
- Sphaeradenia gigantea - Colombia
- Sphaeradenia hamata - Colombia, Ecuador
- Sphaeradenia horrida - Colombia, Ecuador
- Sphaeradenia killipii - Colombia, Ecuador
- Sphaeradenia laucheana - from Costa Rica to Peru
- Sphaeradenia lemaensis - Bolívar in Venezuela
- Sphaeradenia magniglobula - Costa Rica, Panama
- Sphaeradenia marcescens - Ecuador
- Sphaeradenia meridionalis - Peru, Bolivia
- Sphaeradenia occidentalis - Costa Rica
- Sphaeradenia oligostemon - Colombia
- Sphaeradenia oxystigma - Ecuador, Peru
- Sphaeradenia pachystigma - Costa Rica, Panama
- Sphaeradenia pallida - Colombia
- Sphaeradenia perangusta - Amazonas in Peru
- Sphaeradenia praetermissa - Costa Rica
- Sphaeradenia proboscidifera - Colombia
- Sphaeradenia pterostigma - Colombia, Ecuador
- Sphaeradenia pulchra - Colombia
- Sphaeradenia purpurea - Colombia
- Sphaeradenia rhodocephala - Ecuador, Peru
- Sphaeradenia rostellata - Costa Rica
- Sphaeradenia sanctae-barbarae - Ecuador
- Sphaeradenia scandens - Colombia
- Sphaeradenia sphagnicola - Costa Rica
- Sphaeradenia stenosperma - Colombia
- Sphaeradenia steyermarkii - Colombia, Ecuador, Peru
- Sphaeradenia stylosa - Colombia, Ecuador, Peru
- Sphaeradenia vallensis - Colombia
- Sphaeradenia versicolor - Ecuador
- Sphaeradenia virella - Panama
- Sphaeradenia woodsonii - Panama
