= Casatejada =

Coordinates: 39°53′N 5°41′W

Casatejada, Spain
- municipality
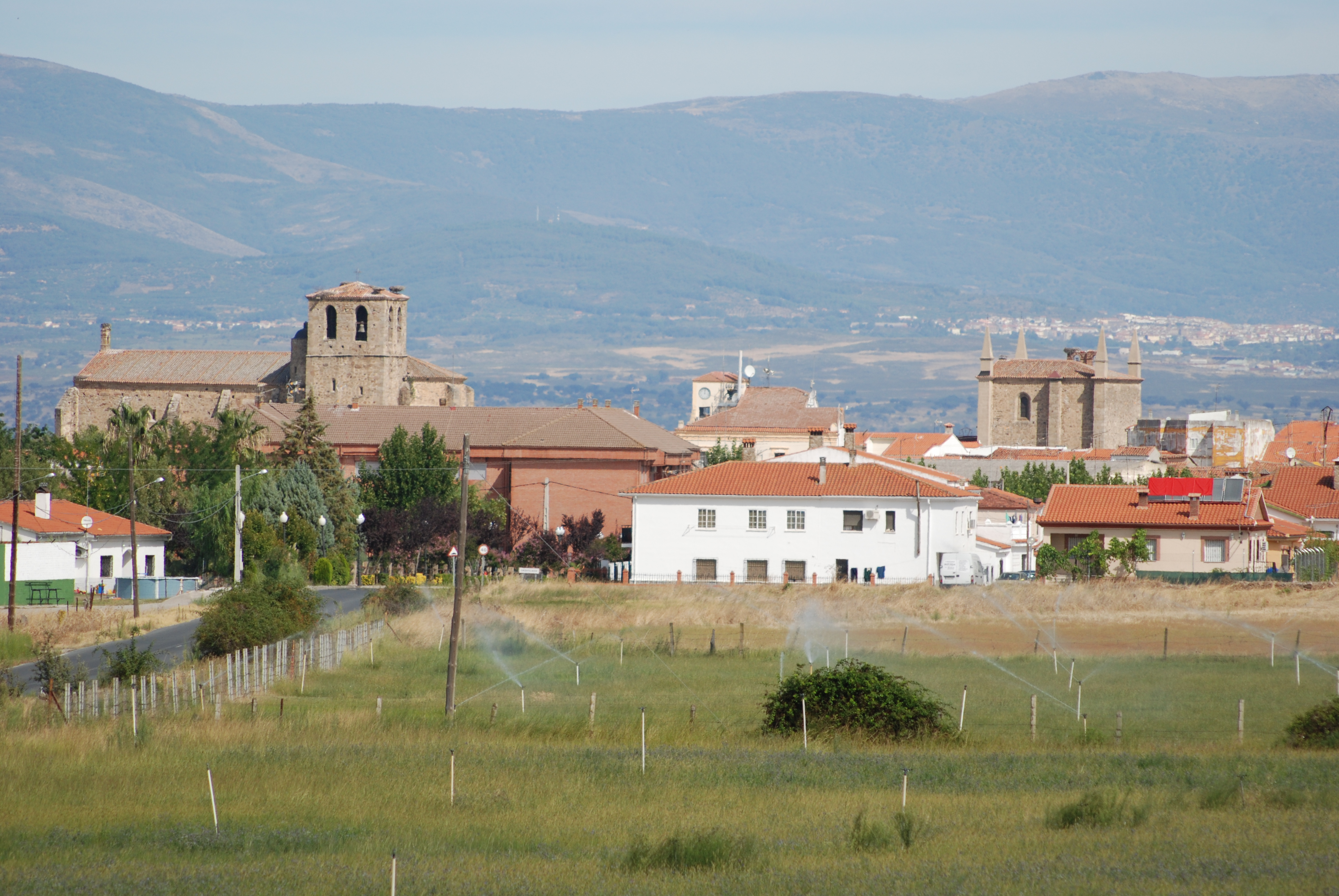
- View of Casatejada

- Flag Coat of arms
- Interactive map of Casatejada, Spain
- Country: Spain
- Autonomous community: Extremadura
- Province: Cáceres
- Municipality: Casatejada

Area
  - Total: 111 km^{2} (43 sq mi)
- Elevation: 272 m (892 ft)

Population (2025-01-01)
  - Total: 1,393
  - Density: 12.5/km^{2} (32.5/sq mi)
- Time zone: UTC+1 (CET)
  - Summer (DST): UTC+2 (CEST)

Casatejada is a municipality located in the province of Cáceres, Extremadura, Spain. According to the 2006 census (INE), the municipality has a population of 1,341 inhabitants.

== See also ==
- List of municipalities in Cáceres
