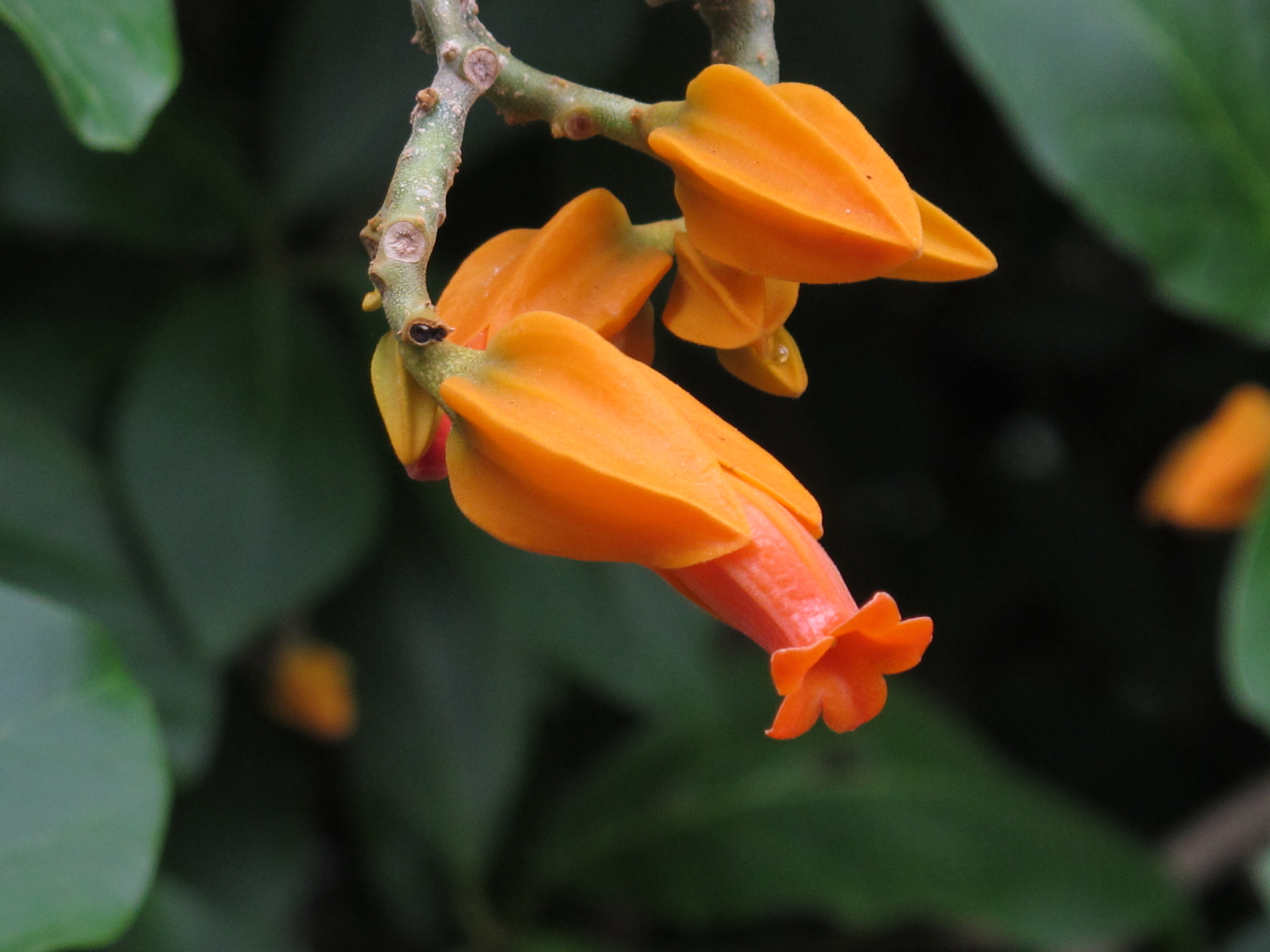
- Juanulloa mexicana

Scientific classification
- Kingdom: Plantae
- Clade: Tracheophytes
- Clade: Angiosperms
- Clade: Eudicots
- Clade: Asterids
- Order: Solanales
- Family: Solanaceae
- Subfamily: Solanoideae
- Tribe: Solandreae
- Subtribe: Juanulloinae
- Genus: Juanulloa; Ruiz & Pav.

Species
- See text

Synonyms
- Ectozoma Miers; Laureria Schltdl.; Portaea Ten.; Rahowardiana D'Arcy; Sarcophysa Miers; Ulloa Pers.

= Juanulloa =

Genus of plants in the nightshade family

Juanulloa, the goldfingers, are a genus of flowering plants in the family Solanaceae, native to Central and South America.

== Species ==
It is likely that Juanulloa is polyphyletic. Species currently accepted by The Plant List are as follows:

- Juanulloa ferruginea Cuatrec.
- Juanulloa globifera (S. Knapp & D'Arcy) S. Knapp
- Juanulloa hookeriana Miers
- Juanulloa mexicana (Schltdl.) Miers
- Juanulloa ochracea Cuatrec.
- Juanulloa parasitica Ruiz & Pav.
- Juanulloa parviflora (Ducke) Cuatrec.
- Juanulloa pavonii (Miers) Benth. & Hook.
- Juanulloa speciosa (Miers) Dunal
- Juanulloa verrucosa (Rusby) Hunz. & Subils
