= Hipólito Ruiz López =

Spanish botanist (1754-1816)

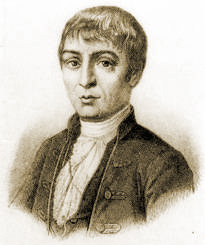
- Born: August 8, 1754; Belorado, Burgos, Kingdom of Spain
- Died: 1816 (aged 61–62); Madrid, Kingdom of Spain
- Scientific career
- Fields: Botany
- Author abbrev. (botany): Ruiz

Hipólito Ruiz López (August 8, 1754 in Belorado, Burgos, Spain – 1816 in Madrid), or Hipólito Ruiz, was a Spanish botanist known for researching the floras of Peru and Chile during an expedition under Carlos III from 1777 to 1788. During the reign of Carlos III, three major botanical expeditions were sent to the New World; Ruiz and José Antonio Pavón Jiménez were the botanists for the first of these expeditions, to Peru and Chile.

== Background ==
After studying Latin with an uncle who was a priest, at the age of 14 Ruiz López went to Madrid to study logic, physics, chemistry and pharmacology. He also studied botany at the Migas Calientes Botanical Gardens (now the Real Jardín Botánico de Madrid), under the supervision of Casimiro Gómez Ortega (1741–1818) and Antonio Palau Verdera (1734–1793).

Ruiz had not yet completed his pharmacology studies when he was named the head botanist of the expedition. The French physician Joseph Dombey was named as his assistant, and the pharmacologist José Antonio Pavón y Jimenez was also appointed. Completing the expedition were the botanical illustrators Joseph Bonete and Isidro Gálvez.

== The expedition ==
The expedition sailed from Cádiz in 1777, arriving at Lima in April 1778. They explored throughout Peru and Chile for ten years (1778–1788), collecting specimens. The expedition collected 3,000 specimens of plants and made 2,500 life-sized botanical illustrations. When they returned to Spain they brought back a great many living plants.

One of the medical remedies brought back by this expedition was the boiled spouts of the quisoar plant, Buddleja incana, which was used to cure colds or, mixed with urine, to alleviate toothache.

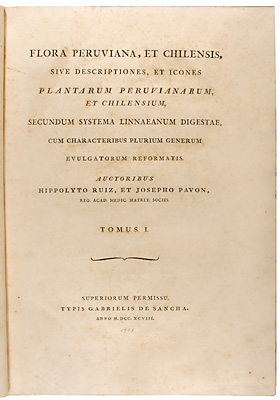
Title page, Flora Peruviana, et Chilensis

The collections arrived in Cádiz in good order (for the most part) in 1788, and were deposited in the Real Jardín Botánico de Madrid and in the Gabinete de Historia Natural, the precursor of the Museum of Natural History. The discoveries included about 150 new genera and 500 new species, which still retain the names given them by Ruiz and Pavón. Unfortunately, a part of the collection consisting of 53 crates with 800 illustrations, dried plants, seeds, resins and minerals was lost when the ship transporting it was wrecked on the coast of Portugal.

Back in Spain, Ruiz finished his pharmacological studies, graduating in 1790. He was named a member of the Royal Academy of Medicine in 1794, and he published various works in that body's Memoires. He and Pavón published Flora Peruviana et Chilensis in ten volumes, richly illustrated with engravings of the specimens. The first four volumes were published between 1798 and 1802. The last six volumes were published after the death of Ruiz. Before his death, Ruiz also published Quinología o tratado del árbol de la quina (Madrid, 1792). This work was soon translated into Italian (1792), German (1794) and English (1800). Alexander von Humboldt cited Ruiz when he published his own treatise on cinchona in 1821.

The journals Ruiz produced for his exploration of South America during these years are remarkable for their breadth of ethnobotanical and natural history knowledge. Of particular interest to the Spanish Crown at the time was pharmacological knowledge of New World plants such as Chinchona, the source of the anti-malarial, quinine. In addition to detailed descriptions and paintings of the flora and fauna of Peru and Chile, Ruiz observed the geology and weather of the area, and included cultural information about the life of the Indians and the colonists of the area.

He died in 1816 (some sources say 1815) in Madrid.

== Genera ==
Genera of plants first named by Ruiz & Pavón, or containing species named by them, include the following:

- Abatia (1794)
- Acaena (1798)
- Acunna (1794)
- Aechmea (1794)
- Aextoxicon (1794)
- Alonsoa (1794)
- Aloysia (1794)
- Alstromeria (1794)
- Alzatea (1794)
- Amaryllis (1802)
- Axinaea (1794)
- Azara (1794)
- Baccharis (1794)
- Bowlesia (1794)
- Brunellia (1795)
- Calandrinia (1794)
- Calceolaria (1798)
- Campomanesia (1794)
- Canna (1794)
- Capsicum (1794)
- Carludovica (1794)
- Cavanillesia (1794)
- Cervantesia (1794)
- Chaetanthera (1794)
- Chondrodendron (1794)
- Cinchona (1794)
- Clarisia (1794)
- Clavija (1794)
- Clethra (1794)
- Collomia (1794)
- Columellia (1794)
- Cordia (1794)
- Cosmibuena (1794)
- Crassula (1794)
- Cyperus (1794)
- Datura (1794)
- Desfontainia (1794)
- Eccremocarpus (1794)
- Escallonia (1794)
- Escobedia (1794)
- Fabiana (1794)
- Fortunatia (1794)
- Fuchsia (1794)
- Galinsoga (1794)
- Geophila (1794)
- Gilia (1794)
- Godoya (1794)
- Gomortega (1794)
- Gonzalagunia (1794)
- Graffenrieda (1794)
- Guatteria (1794)
- Guzmania (1802)
- Herreria (1794)
- Heteranthera (1794)
- Hippotis (1794)
- Huertea (1794)
- Ipomoea (1794)
- Iriartea (1794)
- Jaltomata (1794)
- Jarava (1794)
- Juanulloa (1794)
- Kageneckia (1794)
- Krameria (1794)
- Lapageria (1802)
- Lardizabala (1794)
- Leonia (1794)
- Llagunoa (1794)
- Luzuriaga (1802)
- Malesherbia (1794)
- Margyricarpus (1794)
- Mecardonia (1794)
- Miconia (1794)
- Mollinedia (1794)
- Monnina (1798)
- Montiopsis (1794)
- Moscharia (1794)
- Munnozia (1794)
- Myoschilos (1794)
- Myrospermum (1794)
- Nama (1794)
- Navarretia (1794)
- Neea (1794)
- Olmedia (1794)
- Peperomia (1794)
- Phytelephas (1794)
- Pineda (1794)
- Piper (1794)
- Plazia (1794)
- Polylepis (1794)
- Porcelia (1794)
- Porlieria (1794)
- Pouteria (1794)
- Psammisia (1794)
- Psychotria (1794)
- Renealmia (1794)
- Rhynchotheca (1794)
- Richardella (1794)
- Salpiglossis (1794)
- Sanchezia (1794)
- Saracha (1794)
- Sarmienta (1794)
- Schizanthus (1794)
- Sessea (1794)
- Sobreyra (1794)
- Soliva (1794)
- Spermacoce (1794)
- Sphaeradenia (1794)
- Stipa (1794)
- Tessaria (1794)
- Thibaudia (1794)
- Tillandsia (1794)
- Tovaria (1794)
- Triglochin (1794)
- Triptilion (1794)
- Tropaeolum (1794)
- Vestia (1794)
- Wigandia (1794)
- Vallesia (1794)
- Verbena (1794)
- Xyris (1794)

=== Orchids ===
- Anguloa (1794)
- Bletia (1794)
- Cattleya (1794)
- Epidendrum (1794)
- Fernandezia (1794)
- Gongora (1794)
- Lycaste (1798)
- Masdevallia (1794)
- Maxillaria (1794)
- Rodriguezia (1794)
- Sobralia (1798)

== Other expeditions ==
The four expeditions authorized by King Carlos III to the Spanish colonies were those of Ruiz and Pavón to Peru and Chile (1777–88); José Celestino Mutis to New Granada (1783–1808); Juan de Cuéllar to the Philippines (1786–97); and Martín Sessé y Lacasta to New Spain (1787–1803).

He has been honoured in the naming of 2 plant genera, in 1786, botanist Cav. published Ruizia, a genus of flowering plants from the island of Réunion, belonging to the family Malvaceae. Then in 1936, R.E.Fr. published Ruizodendron, a monotypic genus of flowering plants from South America belonging to the family Annonaceae.
