= José Antonio Pavón Jiménez =

Spanish botanist (1754–1840)

José Antonio Pavón
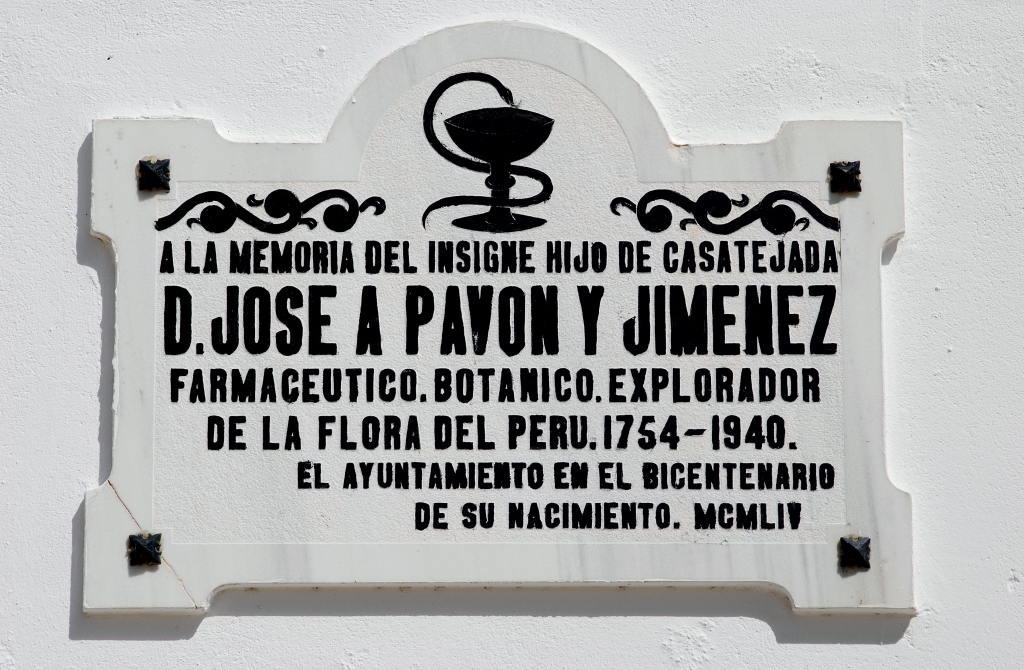
- Plaque dedicated to Pavón in Casatejada
- Born: José Antonio Pavón Jiménez; April 22, 1754; Casatejada, Cáceres, Spain
- Died: 1840 (aged 85–86); Madrid, Spain
- Scientific career
- Fields: Botany
- Author abbrev. (botany): Pav.

José Antonio Pavón Jiménez or José Antonio Pavón (April 22, 1754 in Casatejada, Cáceres, Spain – 1840 in Madrid) was a Spanish botanist known for researching the flora of Peru and Chile.

== Biography ==
During the reign of Charles III of Spain, three major botanical expeditions were sent to the New World; Pavón and Hipólito Ruiz López were the botanists for the first of these expeditions, to Peru and Chile from 1777 to 1788.

The genus Pavonia was named in his honor by his contemporary, Spanish botanist Antonio José Cavanilles — plants with the specific epithet of pavonii also commemorate his name.

== See also ==
- Botanical Expedition to the Viceroyalty of Peru
- List of taxa named by Ruiz and Pavón
