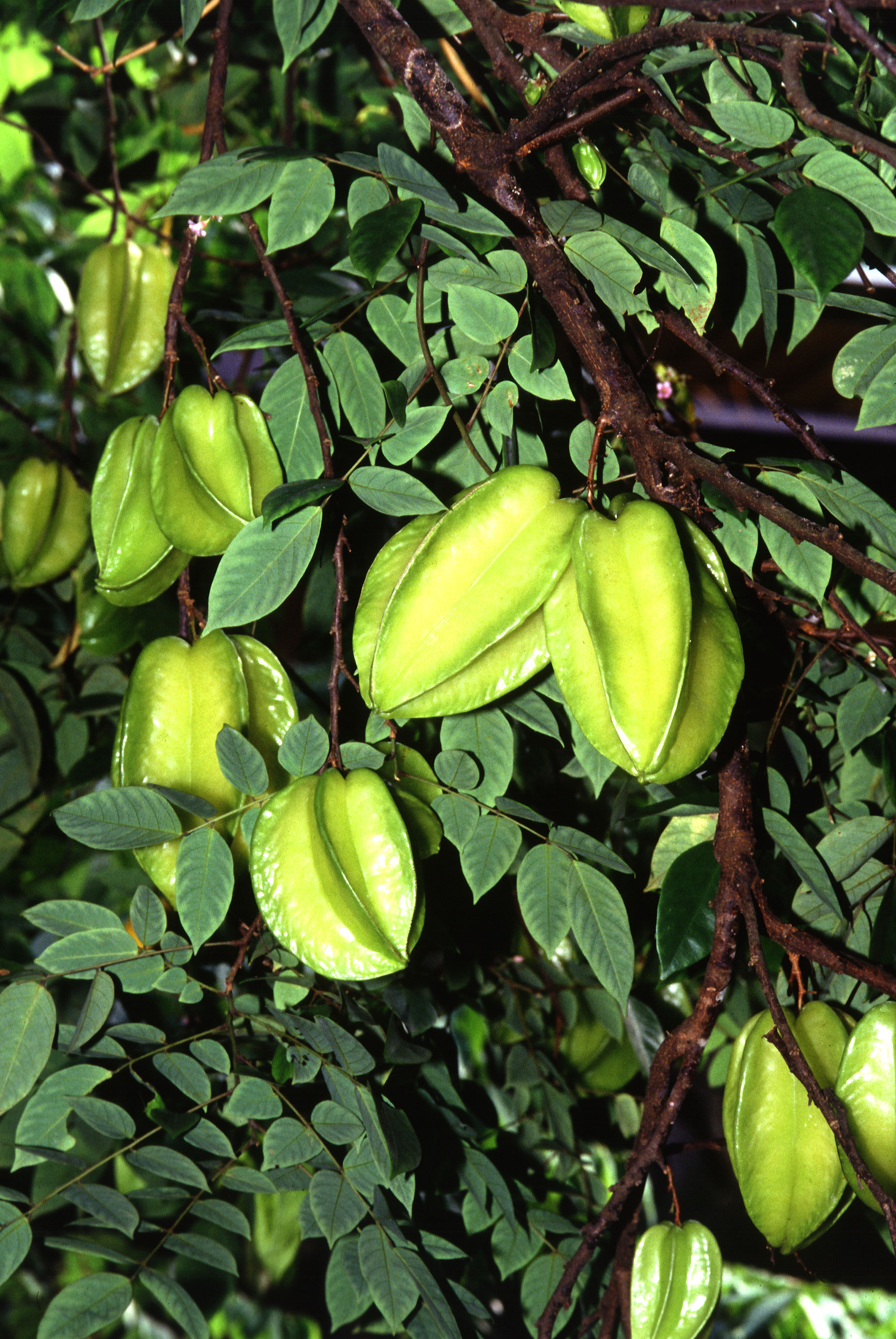
- Carambolas still on the tree

Conservation status
- Data Deficient (IUCN 3.1)

Scientific classification
- Kingdom: Plantae
- Clade: Tracheophytes
- Clade: Angiosperms
- Clade: Eudicots
- Clade: Rosids
- Order: Oxalidales
- Family: Oxalidaceae
- Genus: Averrhoa
- Species: A. carambola

Binomial name
- Averrhoa carambola L.

= Averrhoa carambola =

Species of tree

Averrhoa carambola is a species of tree in the family Oxalidaceae native to tropical Southeast Asia; it has a number of common names, including carambola, star fruit and five-corner. It is a small tree or shrub that grows 5 to 12 m (16 to 39 ft) tall, with rose to red-purple flowers. The flowers are small and bell-shaped, with five petals that have whitish edges. The flowers are often produced year round under tropical conditions. The tree is cultivated in tropical and semitropical regions for its edible fruits.

== Taxonomy ==
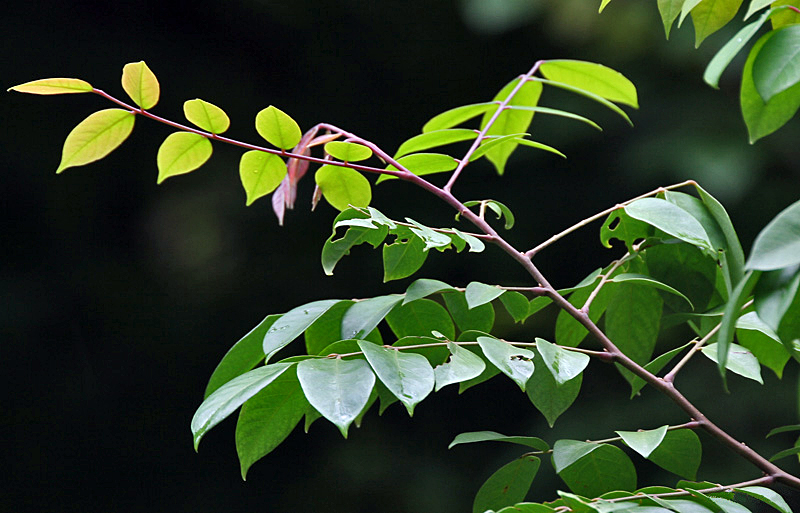
Leaves – both sides, in India

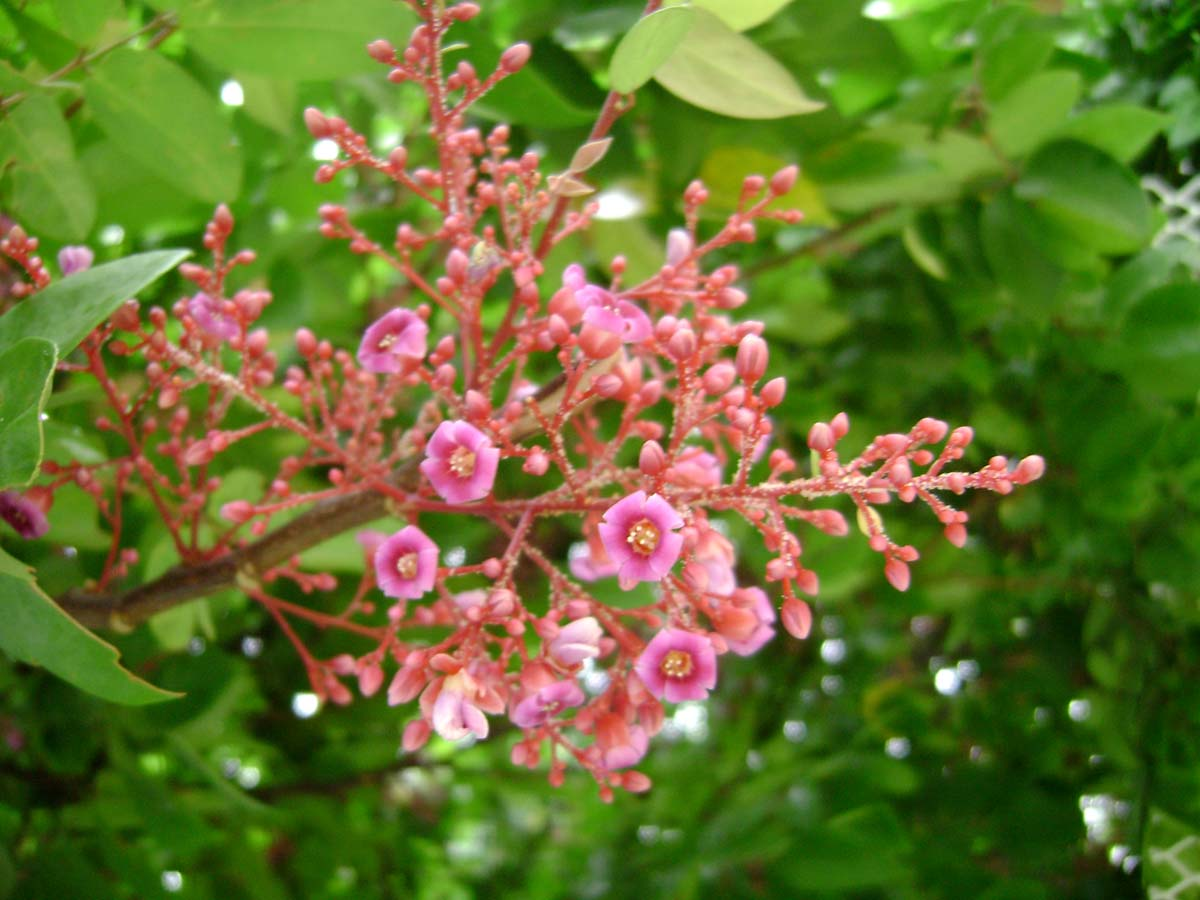
Flowers

The species in the genus Averrhoa along with the species in genus Sarcotheca are the only woody, tree-like plants belonging to the Oxalis family Oxalidaceae. The Oxalis family has nearly 900 species; most are herbaceous perennials or annuals native from tropical and semitropical locations, although a number also grow in other parts of the world. Averrhoa has sometimes been placed in the family Averrhoaceae. Averrhoa carambola is one of two species in the genus Averrhoa, both have edible fruit; the other species A. bilimbi, which is sometimes called the bilimbi or the cucumber tree, is limited to tropical regions. The fruits of A. bilimbi are too sour to be eaten raw, while the sweet forms of A. carambola are eaten raw. The fruits of A. bilimbi and the sour forms—which have high oxalic acid content—of A. carambola are pickled and made into jelly, jam, and juice.

The genus was named after Abū 'l-Walīd Muḥammad bin Aḥmad bin Rushd (better known just as Ibn Rushd), who was called Averroes in European literature - a famous Arabian physician, astronomer and philosopher of the 12th century.

Past synonyms include:

- Averrhoa pentandra Blanco, Fl. Filip., 392. 1837.
- Averrhoa acutangula Stokes, Bot. Mat. Med. vol. 2, 543. 1812.
- Connaropsis philippica Villar in Blanco, Fl. Filip. ed. vol. 3, app. 33. 1880.

The tree and fruits have many different names, carambola is the Spanish vernacular name of the tree. In English it is called star fruit, five-corner or carambola, in Malaysia and the Philippines it has numerous names. In Indonesia it is called belimbing, in Tagalog it is called balimbing. The related bilimbi is called kamias in Tagalog. In French, the tree is called carambolier and the fruit carambole.

== Description ==
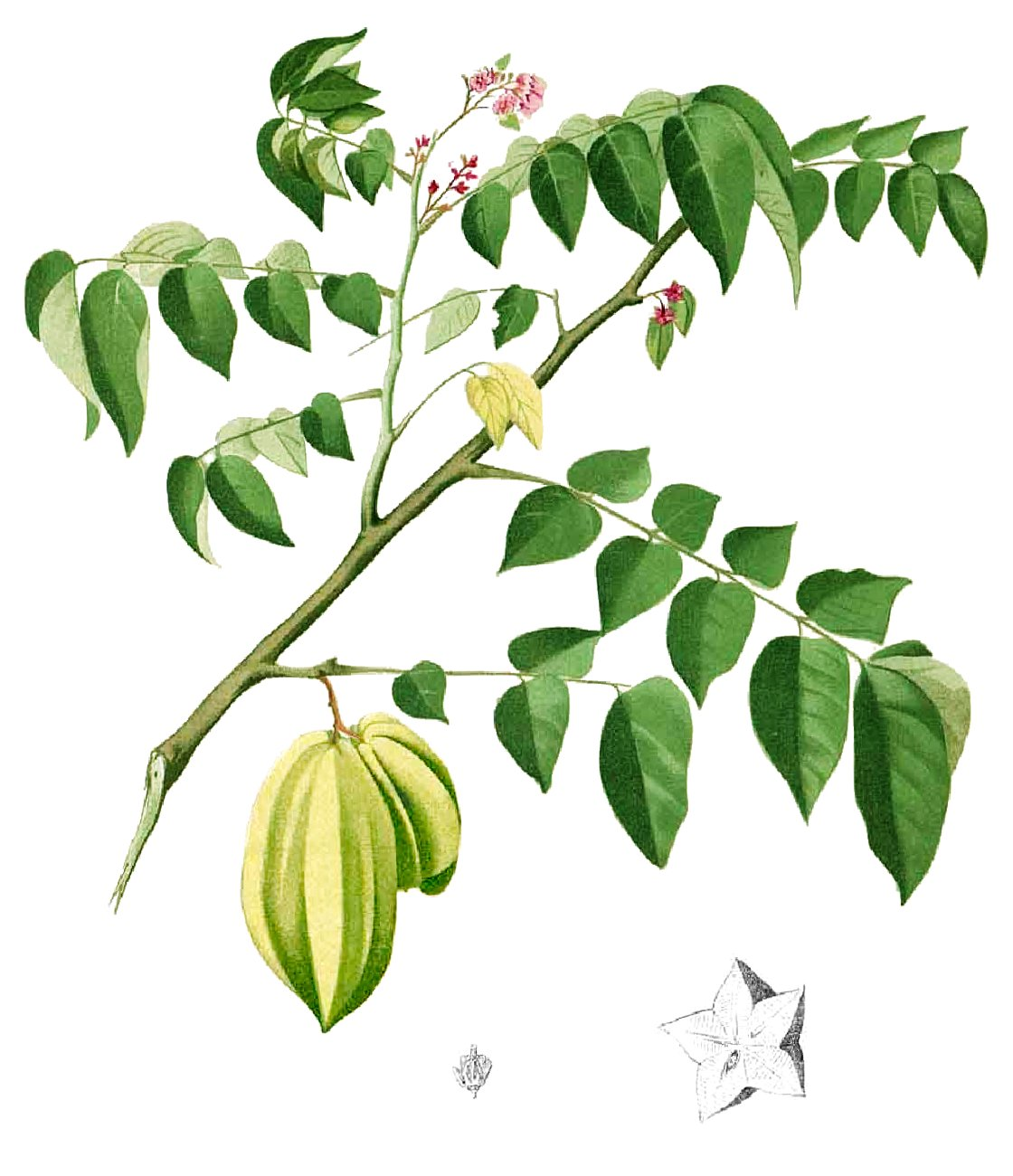
An illustration of the fruit, leaves, and flowers of Averrhoa carambola

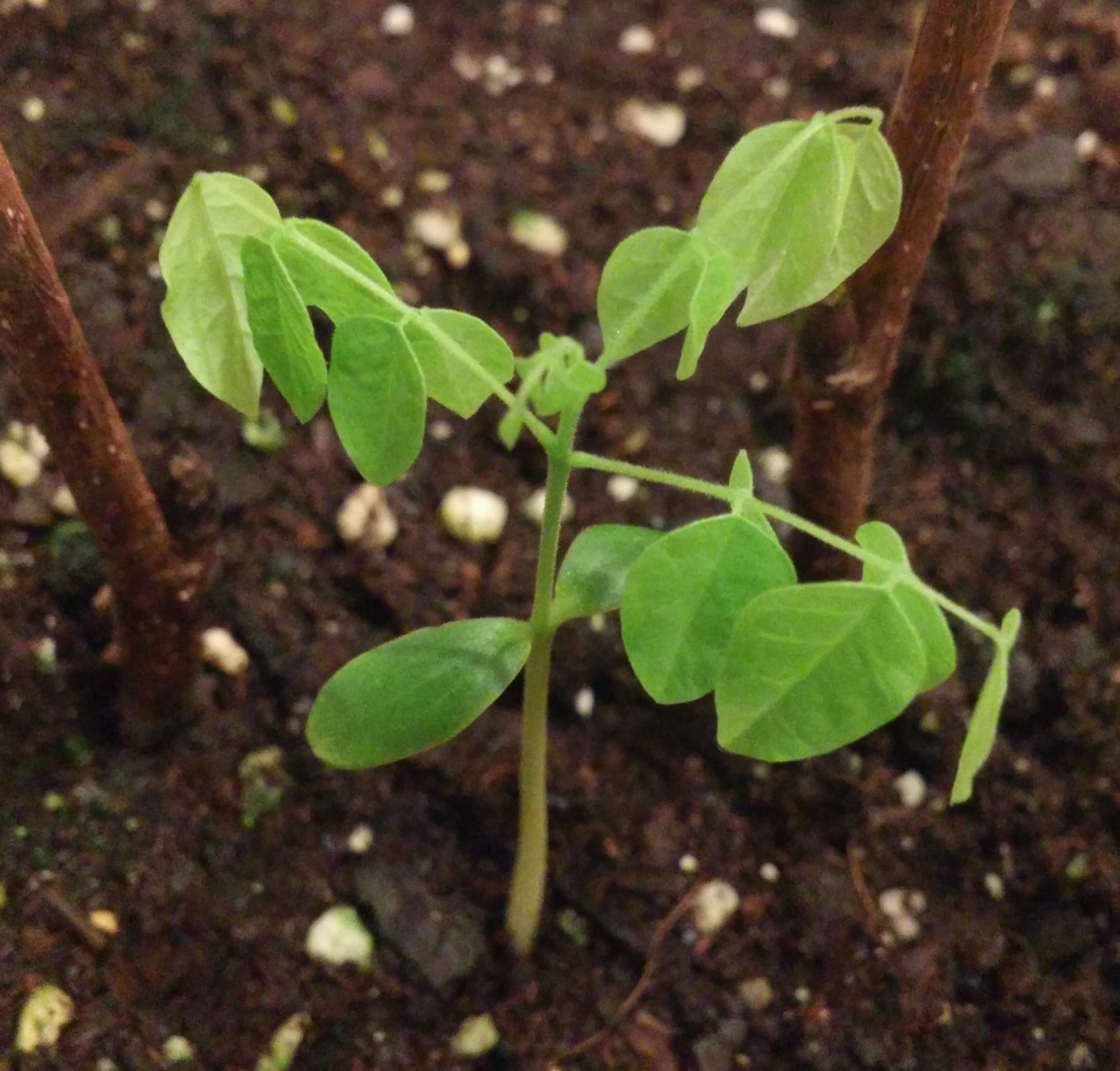
Seedling

Averrhoa carambola is a small, slow-growing evergreen tree with a short-trunk or a shrub. The branches are drooping and the wood is white and turns reddish. It has a bushy shape with many branches producing a broad, rounded crown. The compound leaves are soft, medium-green, they are spirally arranged around the branches in an alternate fashion. The pinnate leaves have a single terminal leaflet and 5 to 11 nearly opposite leaflets, each leaf is 15–20 cm long, and the 3.8–9 cm long leaflets are ovate or ovate-oblong in shape. The top sides of the leaves are smooth and the undersides are finely hairy and whitish. The leaflets are reactive to light and tend to fold together at night, they are also sensitive to abrupt shock and when shaken tend to close up also. The lilac or purple-streaked, downy, flowers are produced in the axils of leaves at the end of twigs. The flowers are arranged in small clusters on the ends of the branches or sometimes on the larger stems and trunk, each cluster is attached to the tree with red stalks. The bell-shaped, perfect flowers, are produced in loose panicles that are much-branched with pedicellate flowers; each flower is around 6 mm wide, with five petals that have recurved ends. The fruits are showy with an oblong shape: they are longitudinally five to six-angled and 6.35–15 cm long and up to 9 cm wide. The fruits have a thin, waxy skin that is orange-yellow colored. The juicy fruits are yellow inside when ripe and have a crisp texture and when cut in cross-section are star-shaped. The fruits have an oxalic acid odor, which varies between plants from strong to mild, the taste also varies from very sour to mildly sweetish. Each fruit may have up to twelve 6–12.5 mm long seeds, which are flat, thin and brown. Some cultivated forms produce fruits with no seeds.

=== Rapid plant movement ===
Rapid plant movement is seen in many plants and there are different mechanisms based on the speed of the movement and the situation the plant is in. Some plants may make movements within 2 seconds while some may take 20 seconds to complete a motion. Additionally, for some plants the movement can involve action potentials being activated, or it can involve changes in water pressure and fluctuation of ions moving in and out of cells. In the case of the Averrhoa carambola plant it takes about 20 seconds for the leaves to move from their horizontal position to vertical. This mechanism involves the flux of ions and water. When the leaves receive an external stimulus (hands, herbivores) this will translate to an electrical stimulus which then leads to the flow of ions (specifically the potassium and chloride) out of the pulvinus. Within the pulvinus, there are flexor and extensor cells, and this is where the change of potassium and chloride concentration occurs. So as you can see in the diagram [where is the diagram?], when the cell is in its turgid state, the leaves are horizontal, and cells are filled with water. So when the chloride and potassium move out of the cells, the water will flux out which results in the leaves facing vertically. This movement of the leaves drooping takes only a couple of seconds as we saw in the video.^{{which video?]} However, when the leaves or the tree is shaken, this will activate contractile proteins that are in the pulvinus, and they will cause the leaves to droop.

There are a few benefits of the drooping of the leaves: one is that it has been hypothesized that when the leaves droop it makes the plant look malnourished and unappealing, so herbivores are compelled to eat a different plant. Additionally, the movement helps the plant with reducing water loss as well as avoid damages.

The mechanism and reasoning for how this movement reduces water loss for plants is not fully known. However, one known mechanism is the closing of the stomatal pores which are the mouths of the plant in which gas exchange occurs. It takes in carbon dioxide which is important for photosynthesis. This movement of the stomatal pores is done by the guard cells that surround the pores. When there is not enough water in the air, the guard cells well release K+ ions into surrounding cells, and this causes water to move out of the guard cells. After the water is moved out the guard cells shrink in size as well as the stomata pores, and this prevents water from escaping through the pores. This information was obtained through Yahyai's research on the starfruit tree's response to differing soil water depletion levels. Trees were grown in a greenhouse, and there were four levels of soil water depletion. Stomatal response, CO_{2} levels, and transpiration were recorded and then analyzed.

Finally, the drooping movement in the star fruit trees helps with reducing leaf damage, protecting it from increased leaf temperature, as well as losing photochemical efficiency (light energy being converted to be used for photosynthesis) from the sun. Excess radiation will act as a stimulus to these leaves, and they will respond with rapid movement. The leaf moving to a position that makes it parallel to the light source is important because the leaves will not be directly facing the sun. This information was found through recording sun to leaf area exposure, canopy diameter, and root growth. Trees had different levels of sun exposure, and how the tree responded was measured and analyzed.

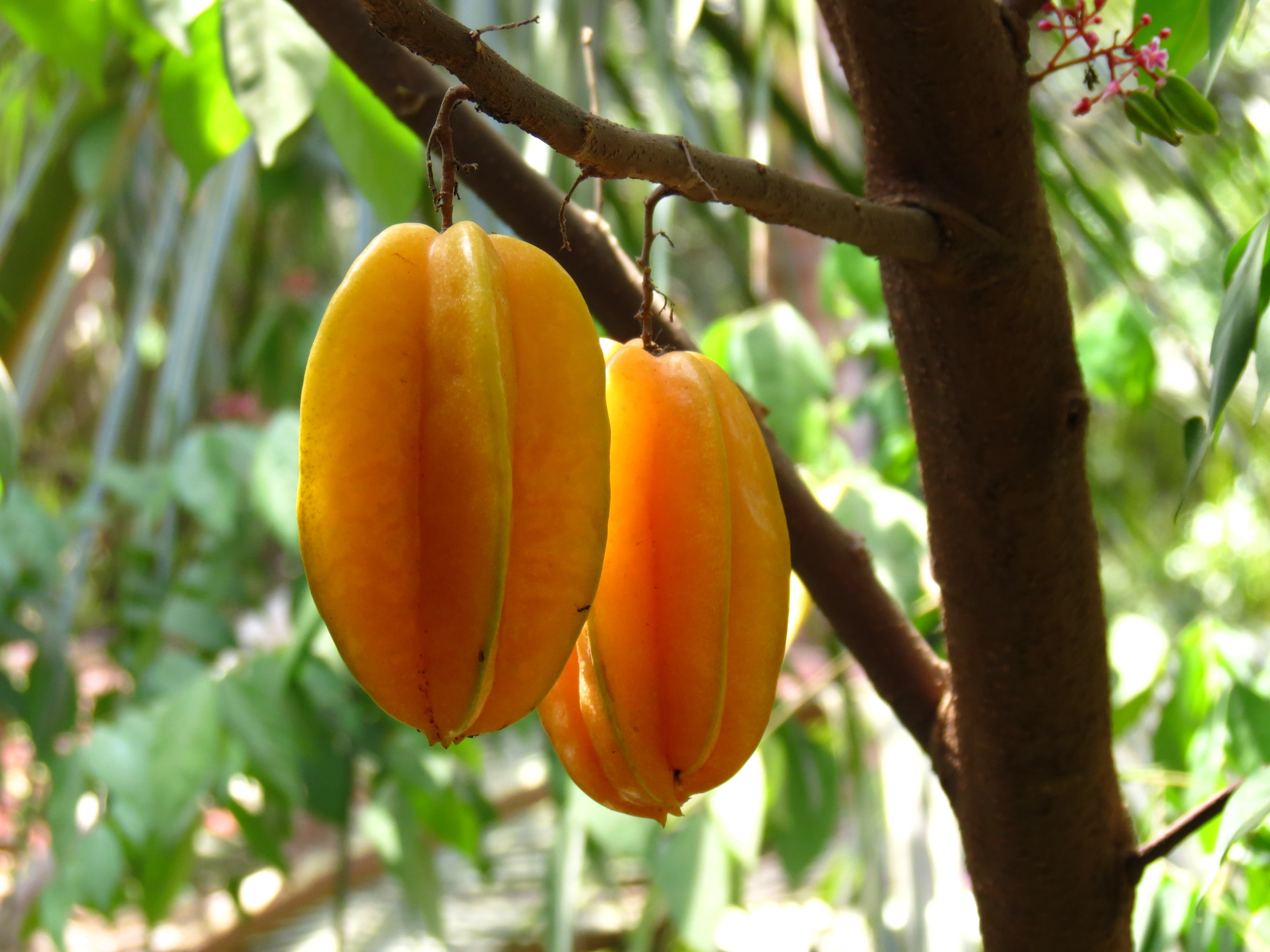
Fruit

== Distribution ==
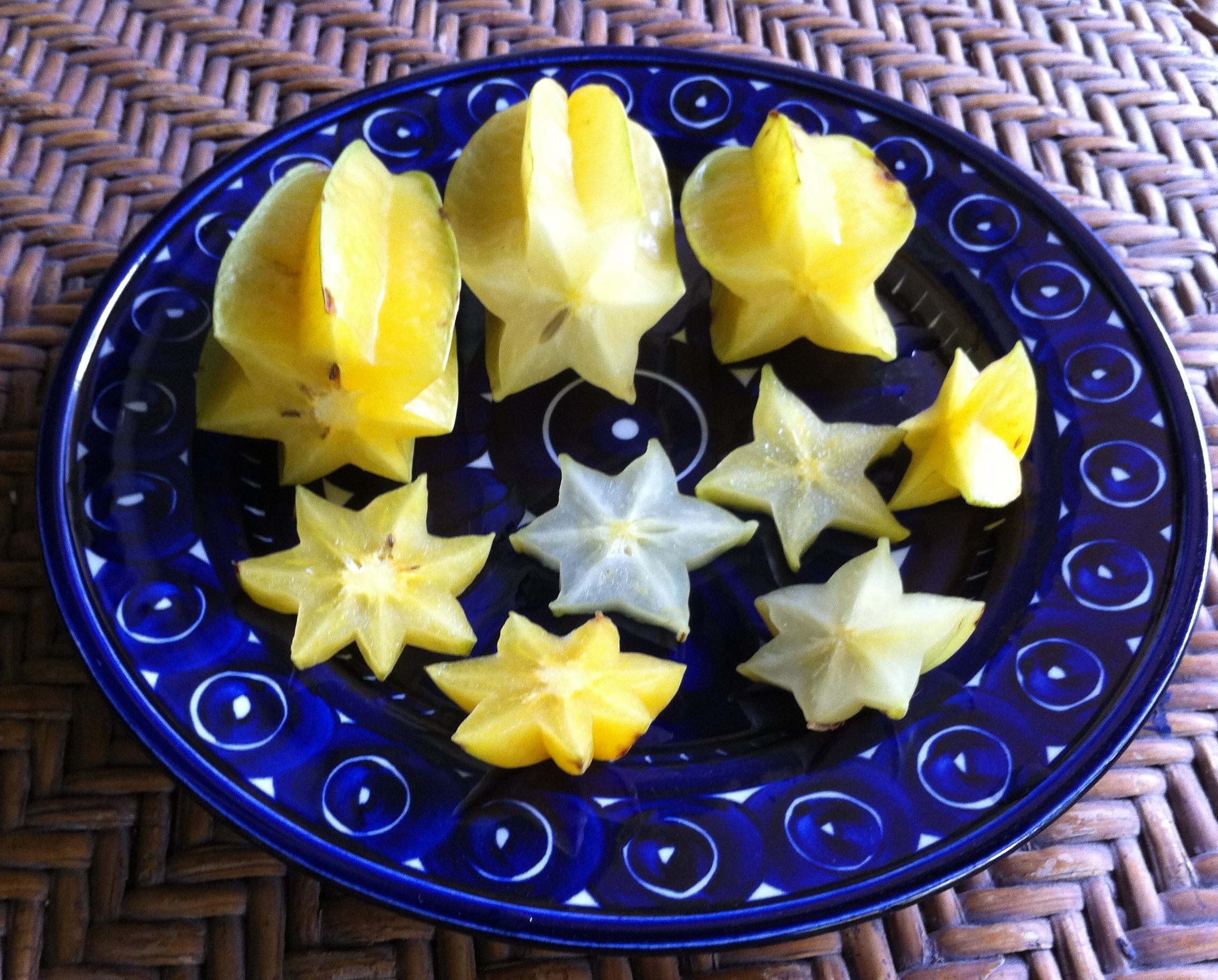
Sliced carambolas having 7, 6, and the usual 5 points

The center of diversity and the original range of Averrhoa carambola is tropical Southeast Asia, where it is cultivated since ancient times. It might have been introduced to the Indian subcontinent and Sri Lanka by Austronesian traders, along with ancient Austronesian cultigens like langsat, and santol. It is native to Southeast Asia, however, because this plant is not found in the wild it is difficult to pinpoint where exactly it originated.

== Uses ==
Averrhoa carambola is best known as the star fruit, as it is best known for the star-like shape it has when cut. In addition to being eaten, the fruit is used in traditional Asian medicine to treat chickenpox, intestinal parasites, headaches, and other illnesses. Star fruit contains oxalate, too much of which can be dangerous.

Starfruit juice can be used to remove stains from linen.

=== Cultivation ===
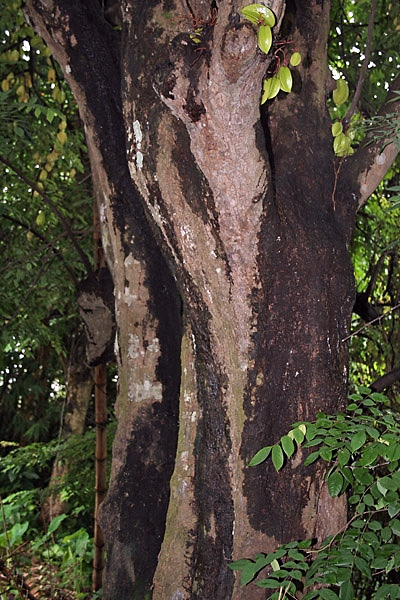
Fruits, leaves and trunk

Averrhoa carambola has a number of different forms differing in fruit taste, texture, and shape, some are very acidic and others are sweet. The plant is grown in Malaysia and Taiwan, with smaller concentrations in Thailand, Israel, The United States, Brazil, Philippines, China, Australia, Indonesia and the warmer parts of India and other areas of the world with the same climate. It has become a commercial crop in many of these locations, grown for its edible fruits. The flowers need cross-pollination to produce fruit, thus seed raised plants are variable. Plants may flower and bear fruit in about a year after seed germination. Larger plants may bloom year-round in tropical areas as long as environmental conditions are suitable, plants may have flowers, unripe and ripe fruit at the same time. Under other climate and environmental conditions, plants tend to bloom in spring, and then off and on again during the rest of the year. Many different cultivars are grown, most are selected to optimize fruit flavor and maximum fruit production for specific growing areas, with each country or region having their own specific selections.

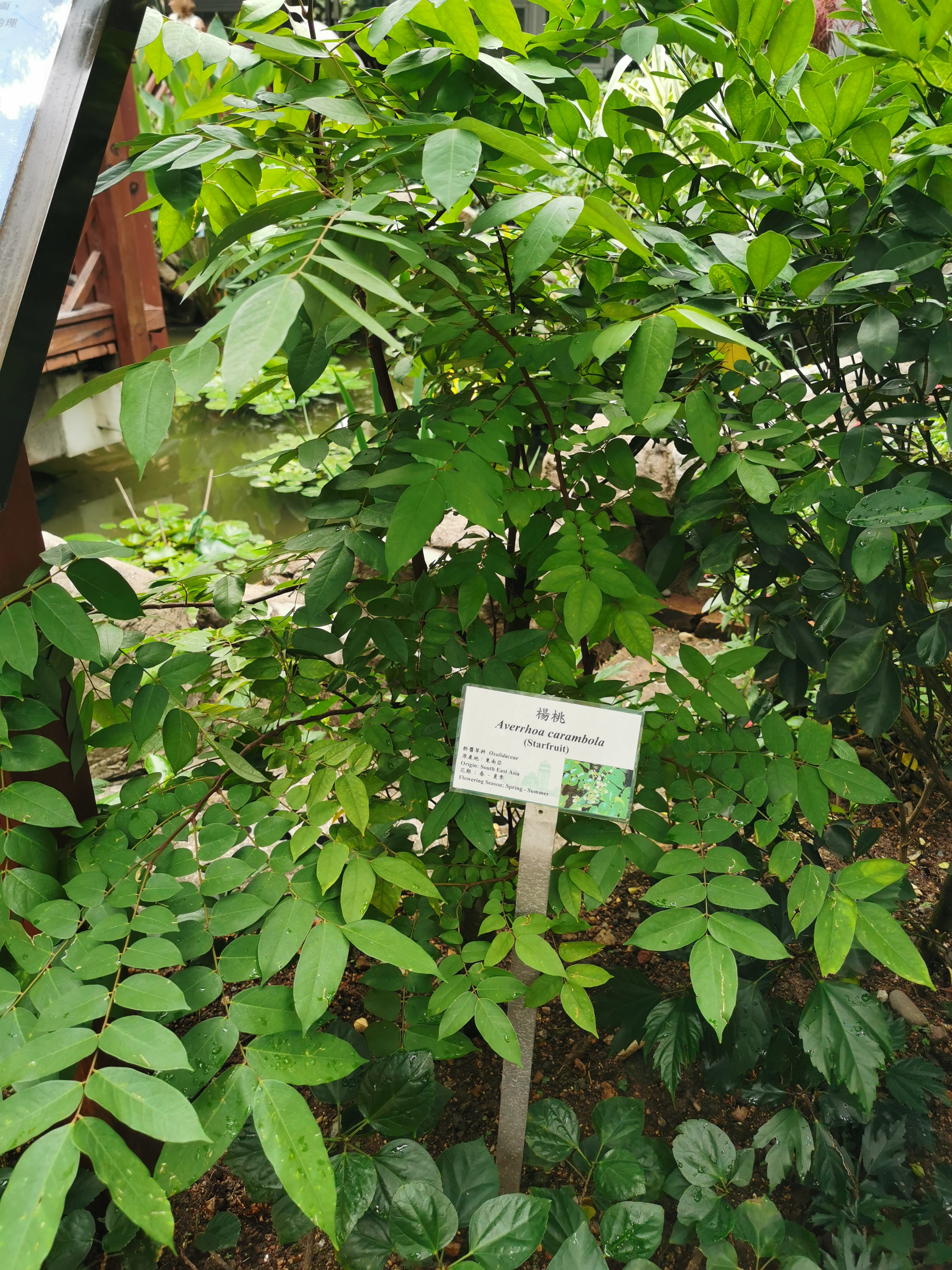
Averrhoa carambola shrub

== Toxicology ==
Like several other plants of the family Oxalidaceae, its fruits are rich in oxalic acid, which is toxic in high concentrations.

There have been reports of intoxication in dialysis and uremic patients caused by a neurotoxin called caramboxin present in the fruit. Such toxin is normally filtered by the kidneys, but patients in dialysis or suffering from kidney deficiencies may show severe symptoms, in a few cases fatal, after drinking the fruit juice.
