= Sarcotheca glomerula =

Conservation status
- Least Concern (IUCN 3.1)

Scientific classification
- Kingdom: Plantae
- Clade: Tracheophytes
- Clade: Angiosperms
- Clade: Eudicots
- Clade: Rosids
- Order: Oxalidales
- Family: Oxalidaceae
- Genus: Sarcotheca
- Species: S. glomerula

Binomial name
- Sarcotheca glomerula (King) Veldkamp

Synonyms
- Connaropsis macrophylla King; Dapania macrophylla (King) R.Knuth

Species of flowering plant

Sarcotheca glomerula is a species of plant in the family Oxalidaceae. It is endemic to Peninsular Malaysia.
