= Sarcotheca monophylla =

Conservation status
- Near Threatened (IUCN 2.3)

Scientific classification
- Kingdom: Plantae
- Clade: Tracheophytes
- Clade: Angiosperms
- Clade: Eudicots
- Clade: Rosids
- Order: Oxalidales
- Family: Oxalidaceae
- Genus: Sarcotheca
- Species: S. monophylla

Binomial name
- Sarcotheca monophylla (Planch. ex Hk.f.) Hallier.f.

Species of tree

Sarcotheca monophylla is a species of plant in the family Oxalidaceae. It is a tree endemic to Peninsular Malaysia.
