= C11H13NO6 =

The molecular formula C_{11}H_{13}NO_{6} (molar mass: 255.23 g/mol, exact mass: 255.0743 u) may refer to:

- Caramboxin
- Diroximel fumarate
