= Sarcotheca diversifolia =

Scientific classification
- Kingdom: Plantae
- Clade: Tracheophytes
- Clade: Angiosperms
- Clade: Eudicots
- Clade: Rosids
- Order: Oxalidales
- Family: Oxalidaceae
- Genus: Sarcotheca
- Species: S. diversifolia

Binomial name
- Sarcotheca diversifolia (Miq.) Hallier. f.

Synonyms
- Rourea diversifolia Miq.; Santalodes diversifolia Kuntze; Sarcotheca subtriplinervis Hallier f.

Species of flowering plant

Sarcotheca diversifolia, also known as pupoi or belimbing bulat in Malay and more locally as tabarus, piang or belimbing hutan, is a species of flowering plant, a fruit tree in the wood sorrel family, that is native to Southeast Asia.

== Description ==
The species grows as a tree to 30 m in height, with a fluted bole of up to 5 m, sometimes with buttresses up to 2 m. The oval leaves are 3–10 cm long by 1–5 cm wide. The inflorescences comprise clusters of panicles of pink and purple flowers in the leaf axils. The oval berries are 2–3 cm by 1.5–2 cm in diameter, green to yellowish-green ripening yellow, with the seeds contained in the edible, juicy, fleshy, translucent to white mesocarp. The species is occasionally cultivated and the fruits eaten raw or cooked with meat and vegetables.

== Distribution and habitat ==
The species is found in Borneo and Sumatra. It occurs in mixed lowland and hill dipterocarp, peatswamp and secondary forests, up to an elevation of 900 m.
