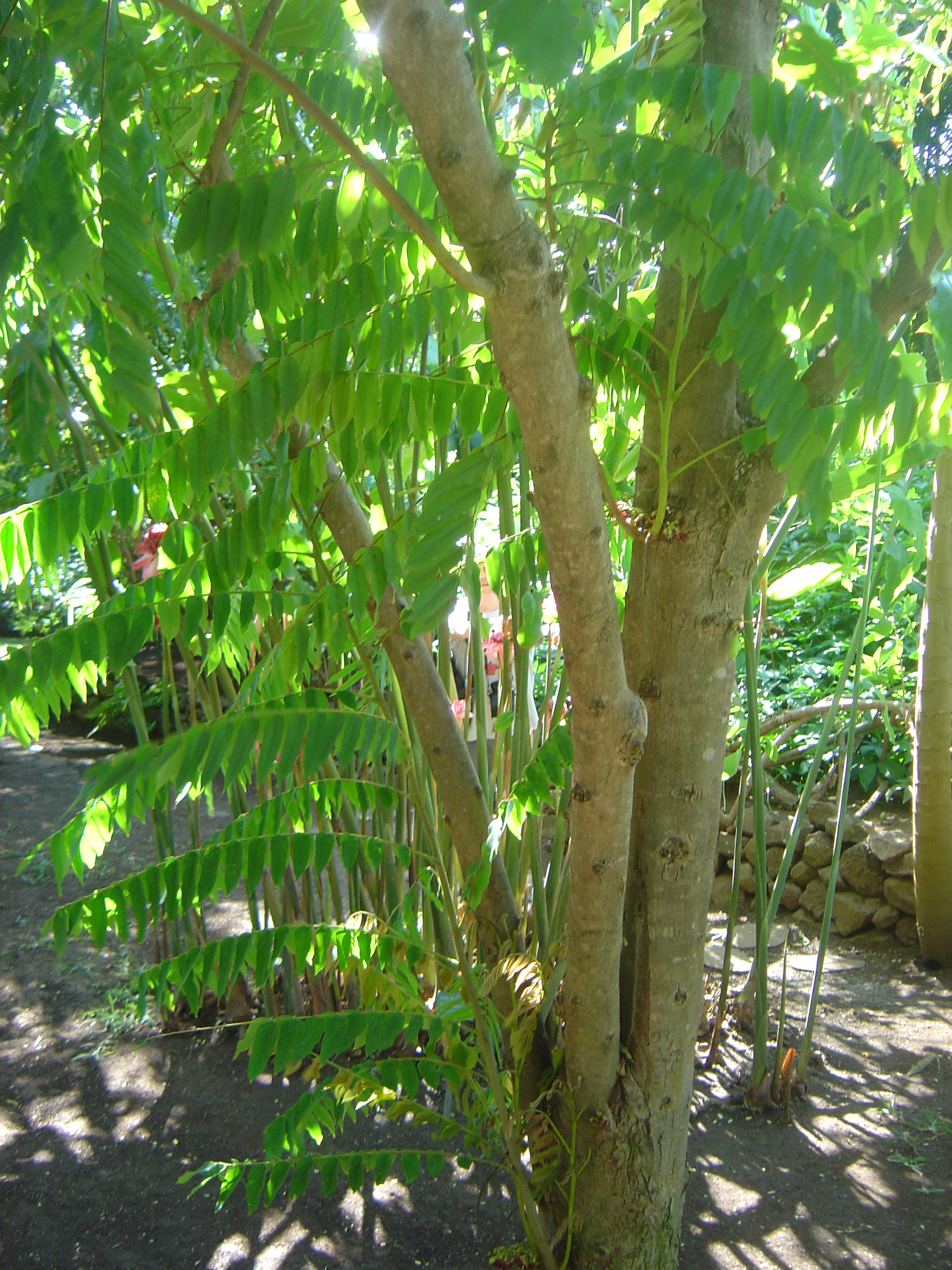
- Averrhoa bilimbi

Scientific classification
- Kingdom: Plantae
- Clade: Embryophytes
- Clade: Tracheophytes
- Clade: Angiosperms
- Clade: Eudicots
- Clade: Rosids
- Order: Oxalidales
- Family: Oxalidaceae
- Genus: Averrhoa; L.

Species
- 4; see text

Synonyms
- Carambola Adans.; Oxynia Noronha, nom. nud.

= Averrhoa =

Genus of trees native to Southeast Asia

Averrhoa is a genus of understorey trees in the wood sorrel family Oxalidaceae. It includes four species native to Maritime Southeast Asia, Java, the Maluku Islands, New Guinea, and Sulawesi. The genus is named after Averroes, a 12th-century astronomer and philosopher from Al-Andalus.

Two species, the carambola and the bilimbi, are cultivated for their fruits.

== Species ==
Four species are accepted.

- Averrhoa bilimbi L. – bilimbi
- Averrhoa carambola L. – starfruit or carambola
- Averrhoa dolichocarpa Rugayah & Sunarti
- Averrhoa leucopetala Rugayah & Sunarti
