= Sarcotheca glauca =

Conservation status
- Least Concern (IUCN 3.1)

Scientific classification
- Kingdom: Plantae
- Clade: Tracheophytes
- Clade: Angiosperms
- Clade: Eudicots
- Clade: Rosids
- Order: Oxalidales
- Family: Oxalidaceae
- Genus: Sarcotheca
- Species: S. glauca

Binomial name
- Sarcotheca glauca (Hook.f.) Hallier f.

Synonyms
- Connaropsis glauca Hook.f.

Species of tree

Sarcotheca glauca is a tree in the family Oxalidaceae. The specific epithet glauca means 'blue grey', referring to the underside of the leaf.

== Description ==
Sarcotheca glauca grows up to 21 m (70 ft) tall, with a trunk diameter of up to 30 cm (12 in). The scaly bark is smooth to fissured. The leaves are oblong to elliptic and measure up to 11 cm (4 in) long. The inflorescences are in panicles and feature red flowers.

== Distribution and habitat ==
Sarcotheca glauca is endemic to Borneo. Its habitat is in lowland forests, on hills or in dipterocarp or kerangas forests.
