= Sarcotheca macrophylla =

Conservation status
- Least Concern (IUCN 3.1)

Scientific classification
- Kingdom: Plantae
- Clade: Tracheophytes
- Clade: Angiosperms
- Clade: Eudicots
- Clade: Rosids
- Order: Oxalidales
- Family: Oxalidaceae
- Genus: Sarcotheca
- Species: S. macrophylla

Binomial name
- Sarcotheca macrophylla Blume

Synonyms
- Roucheria macrophylla (Blume) Miq.

Species of tree

Sarcotheca macrophylla is a tree in the family Oxalidaceae. The specific epithet macrophylla means 'large leaf'.

== Description ==
Sarcotheca macrophylla grows up to 15 m (50 ft) tall, with a trunk diameter of up to 10 cm (4 in). The smooth bark is brown. The leathery leaves are oblanceolate to oblong and measure up to 26 cm (10 in) long. The inflorescences are in panicles and feature dark red flowers. The roundish fruits are dark red.

== Distribution and habitat ==
Sarcotheca macrophylla is endemic to Borneo, where it is known only from Sarawak and Kalimantan. Its habitat is in lowland forests on sandy soils.
