= Sarcotheca ochracea =

Conservation status
- Vulnerable (IUCN 2.3)

Scientific classification
- Kingdom: Plantae
- Clade: Tracheophytes
- Clade: Angiosperms
- Clade: Eudicots
- Clade: Rosids
- Order: Oxalidales
- Family: Oxalidaceae
- Genus: Sarcotheca
- Species: S. ochracea

Binomial name
- Sarcotheca ochracea Hallier f.

Species of tree

Sarcotheca ochracea is a species of plant in the family Oxalidaceae. It is a tree endemic to Borneo where it is confined to Sarawak.
