= Sarcotheca rubrinervis =

Conservation status
- Least Concern (IUCN 3.1)

Scientific classification
- Kingdom: Plantae
- Clade: Tracheophytes
- Clade: Angiosperms
- Clade: Eudicots
- Clade: Rosids
- Order: Oxalidales
- Family: Oxalidaceae
- Genus: Sarcotheca
- Species: S. rubrinervis

Binomial name
- Sarcotheca rubrinervis Hallier f.

Synonyms
- Sarcotheca oblongifolia Merr.

Species of tree

Sarcotheca rubrinervis is a tree in the family Oxalidaceae. The specific epithet rubrinervis means 'red nerve', referring to the leaf veins.

== Description ==
Sarcotheca rubrinervis grows up to 20 m (70 ft) tall, with a trunk diameter of up to 30 cm (12 in). The smooth bark is brown to reddish. The leaves are lanceolate to oblong and measure up to 15 cm (6 in) long. The leaf veins may have a reddish colour. The inflorescences are in panicles and feature red flowers, occasionally white. The roundish fruits are red to pink.

== Distribution and habitat ==
Sarcotheca rubrinervis is endemic to Borneo, where it is known from Sabah and Kalimantan. Its habitat is in lowland forests near rivers.
