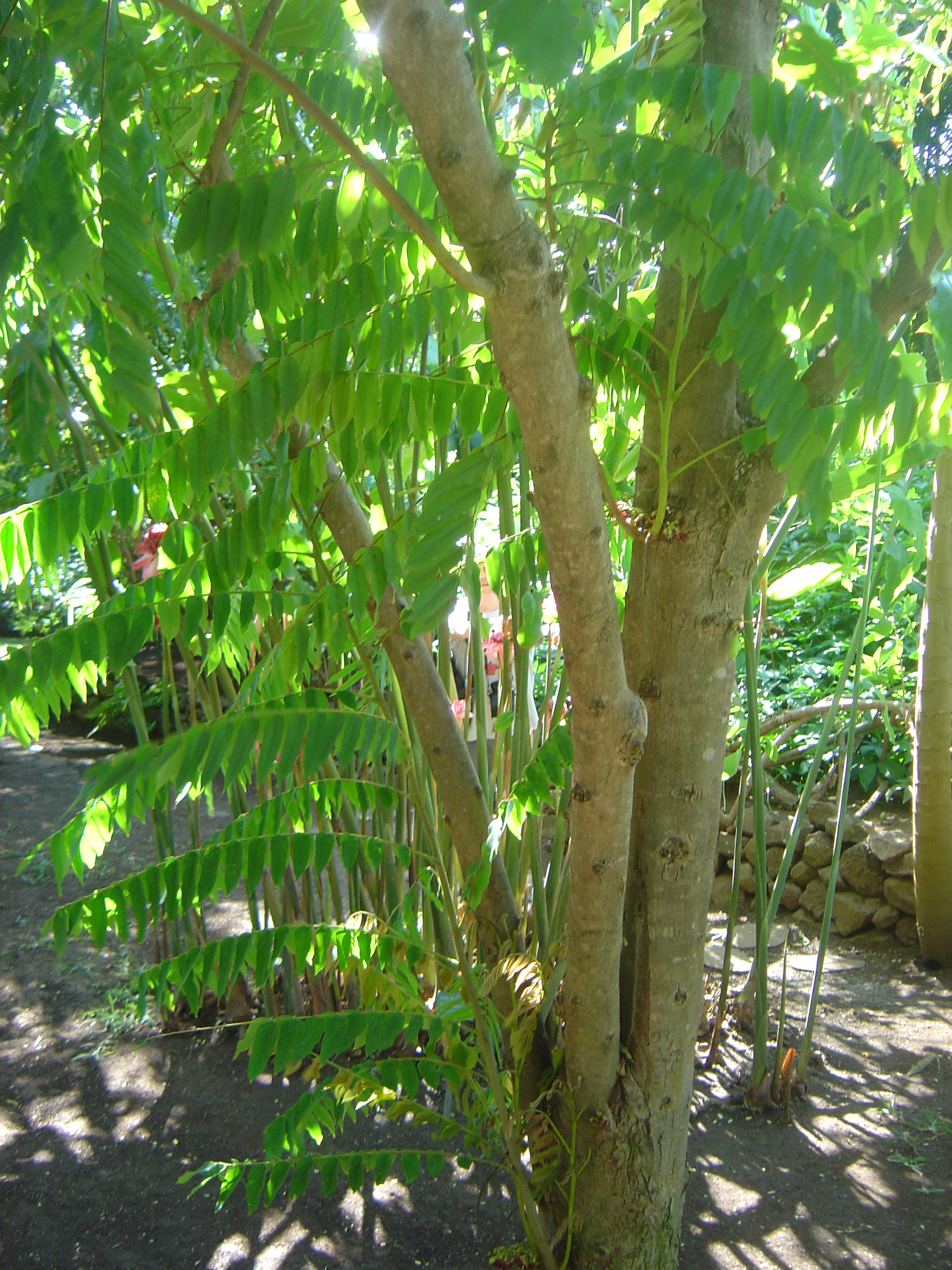

Scientific classification
- Kingdom: Plantae
- Clade: Tracheophytes
- Clade: Angiosperms
- Clade: Eudicots
- Clade: Rosids
- Order: Oxalidales
- Family: Oxalidaceae
- Genus: Averrhoa
- Species: A. bilimbi

Binomial name
- Averrhoa bilimbi L.

Synonyms
- Averrhoa abtusangulata Stokes; Averrhoa obtusangula Stokes

= Averrhoa bilimbi =

Species of tree

Averrhoa bilimbi (commonly known as bilimbi, orkkaappuli, cucumber tree, or tree sorrel) is a fruit-bearing tree in the family Oxalidaceae. It is native to the Maluku Islands and Sulawesi in Indonesia, and has become naturalised and is common throughout Southeast Asia. It is cultivated in parts of tropical South Asia and the Americas. It bears edible but extremely sour fruit. It is a close relative of the carambola tree.

== Description ==
Averrhoa bilimbi is a small tropical tree reaching up to 15 m in height. It is often multitrunked, quickly dividing into ramifications. Bilimbi leaves are alternate, pinnate, measuring approximately 30–60 cm in length. Each leaf contains 11-37 leaflets; ovate to oblong, 2–10 cm long, and 1–2 cm wide, and cluster at branch extremities. The leaves are quite similar to those of the Otaheite gooseberry. The tree is cauliflorous with 18–68 flowers in panicles that form on the trunk and other branches. The flowers are heterostylous, borne in a pendulous panicle inflorescence. The flower is fragrant, corolla of 5 petals 10–30 mm long, yellowish green to reddish purple.

The fruit is ellipsoidal, elongated, measuring about 4 – 10 cm and sometimes faintly 5-angled. The skin is smooth to slightly bumpy, thin, and waxy turning from light green to yellowish-green when ripe. The flesh is crisp and the juice is sour and extremely acidic and therefore not typically consumed as fresh fruit by itself.

The odd-pinnate leaves hang down at night, then raise in the morning in stages like "two steps forward, one step back" and descend in the same manner in the evening.

== Distribution and habitat ==
Averrhoa bilimbi is believed to be originally native to the Moluccas of Indonesia. The species is now cultivated and found throughout Indonesia, Timor-Leste, the Philippines, Sri Lanka, Bangladesh, the Maldives, Myanmar (Burma), and Malaysia. It is also common in other Southeast Asian countries. In India, where it is usually found in gardens, the bilimbi has gone wild in the warmest regions of the country. It is also seen in coastal regions of South India.

Outside of Asia, the tree is cultivated in Zanzibar. In 1793, the bilimbi was introduced to Jamaica from Timor and after several years, was cultivated throughout Central and South America where it is known as mimbro. In Suriname, this fruit is known as lange birambi. Introduced to Queensland at the end of the 19th century, it has been grown commercially in the region since that time. In Guyana, it is called Sourie, One Finger, Bilimbi, and Kamranga.

This is a tropical tree, less resistant to cold than the carambola, growing best in rich and well-drained soil (but also stands limestone and sand). It prefers evenly distributed rainfall throughout the year, but with a 2- to 3-month dry season. Therefore, the species is not found, for example, in the wettest part of Malaysia. In Florida, where it is occasionally cultivated as a curiosity, the tree needs protection from wind and cold.

== Uses ==
=== Culinary ===
In Indonesia, A. bilimbi, locally known as belimbing wuluh, is often used to give a sour or acidic flavour to food, substituting tamarind or tomato. In the northwestern province of Aceh, it is preserved by salting and sun-drying to make asam sunti, a kitchen seasoning to make a variety of Acehnese dishes. It is a key ingredient in many Indonesian dishes such as sambal belimbing wuluh.

In the Philippines, where it is commonly called kamias and ibâ, it is commonly found in backyards. The fruit are eaten either raw or dipped in rock salt. It can be either curried or added as a souring agent for common Filipino dishes such as sinigang, pinangat and paksiw. It can be sun-dried for preservation and used as a spice. It is also used to make a salad mixed with tomatoes, and chopped onions, with soy sauce as dressing.

The uncooked bilimbi is prepared as relish and served with rice and beans in Costa Rica.

In Asia, where the tree originated, it is sometimes added to curry.

In Malaysia and the Philippines, bilimbi or kamias is made into a rather sweet and sour jam, with a flavour profile similar to prunes or plums.

In Kerala and Coastal Karnataka, India, it is used for making pickles and fish curry, especially with sardines, while around Karnataka, Maharashtra, and Goa the fruit is commonly eaten raw with salt and spice. In Guyana and Mauritius, it is made into achars/pickles.

In the Maldives where it is known as bilimagu, it is pickled with aromatic spices and eaten with rice and local Garudhiya (fish soup). It is also used in various Maldivian local dishes such as Boakibaa and Mashuni as a souring agent.

In Seychelles, it is often used as an ingredient to give a tangy flavour to many Seychellois creole dishes, especially fish dishes. It is often used in grilled fish and also (almost always) in a shark meat dish, called satini reken. It is also cooked down with onion, tomato, and chili peppers to make a sauce. Sometimes they are cured with salt to be used when they are out of season.

Bilimbi juice (with a pH of about 4.47) is made into a cooling beverage. It can replace mango in making chutney. Additionally, the fruit can be preserved by pickling, which reduces its acidity.

== Potential adverse effect ==
The fruit contains high levels of oxalate. Acute kidney injury due to tubular necrosis caused by oxalate has been recorded in several people who drank the concentrated juice on continuous days as treatment for high cholesterol.

The fruit also contains the neurotoxin caramboxin. The combination of both substances can also cause acute kidney injury when the fruit is consumed in excess, akin to the case with carambola. Even for those with prior normal renal function, this can result in neurotoxic as well as nephrotoxic effects.

== Other uses ==
In Indonesia, very acidic bilimbis are used to clean kris blades.

In the Philippines, it is often used in rural places as an alternative stain remover.

In the region of Addu in Maldives, the flowers of the bilimbi plant were commonly used in the 20th century as a cloth dye.

== Gallery ==
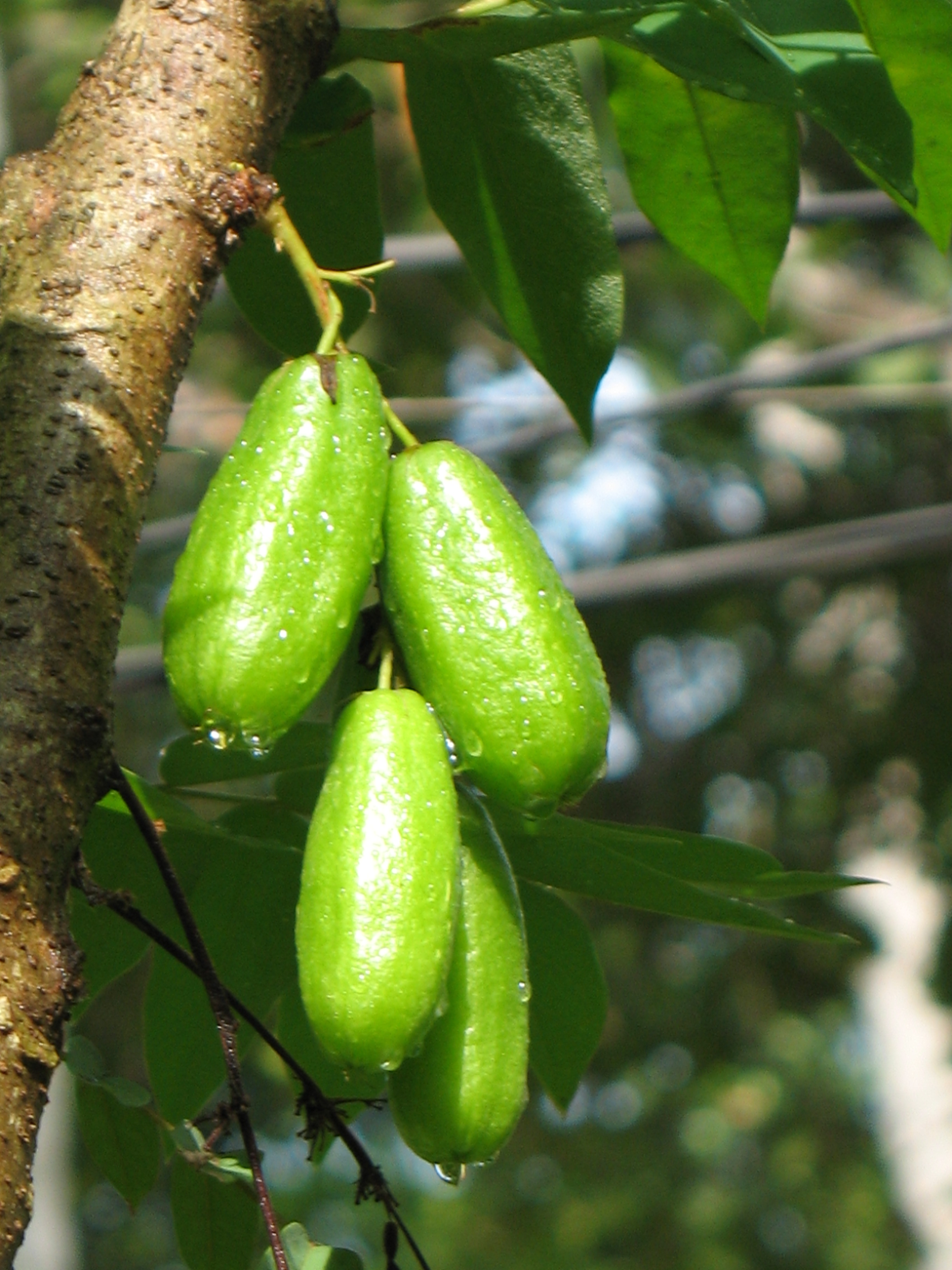
Fruit

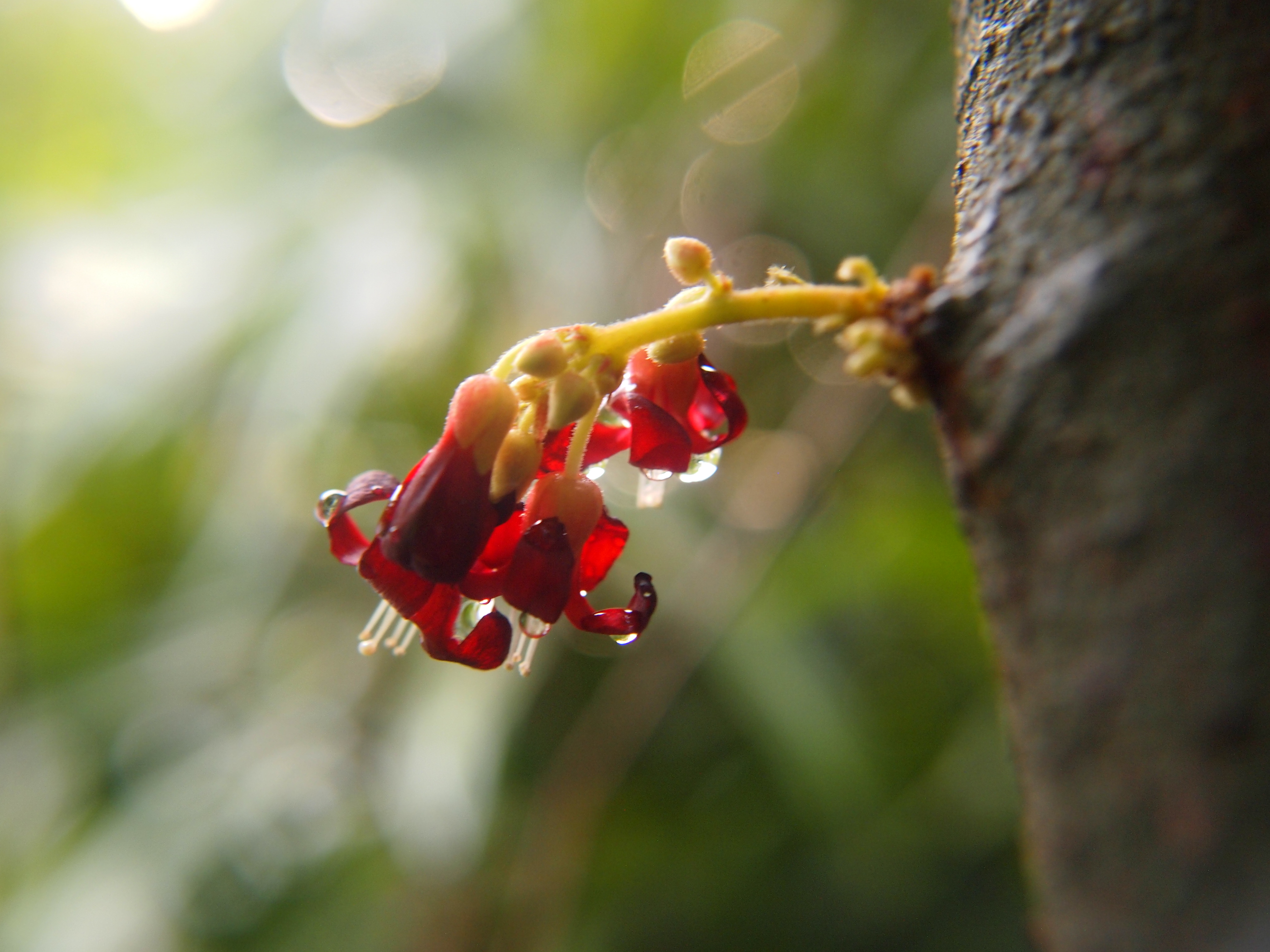
Flowers

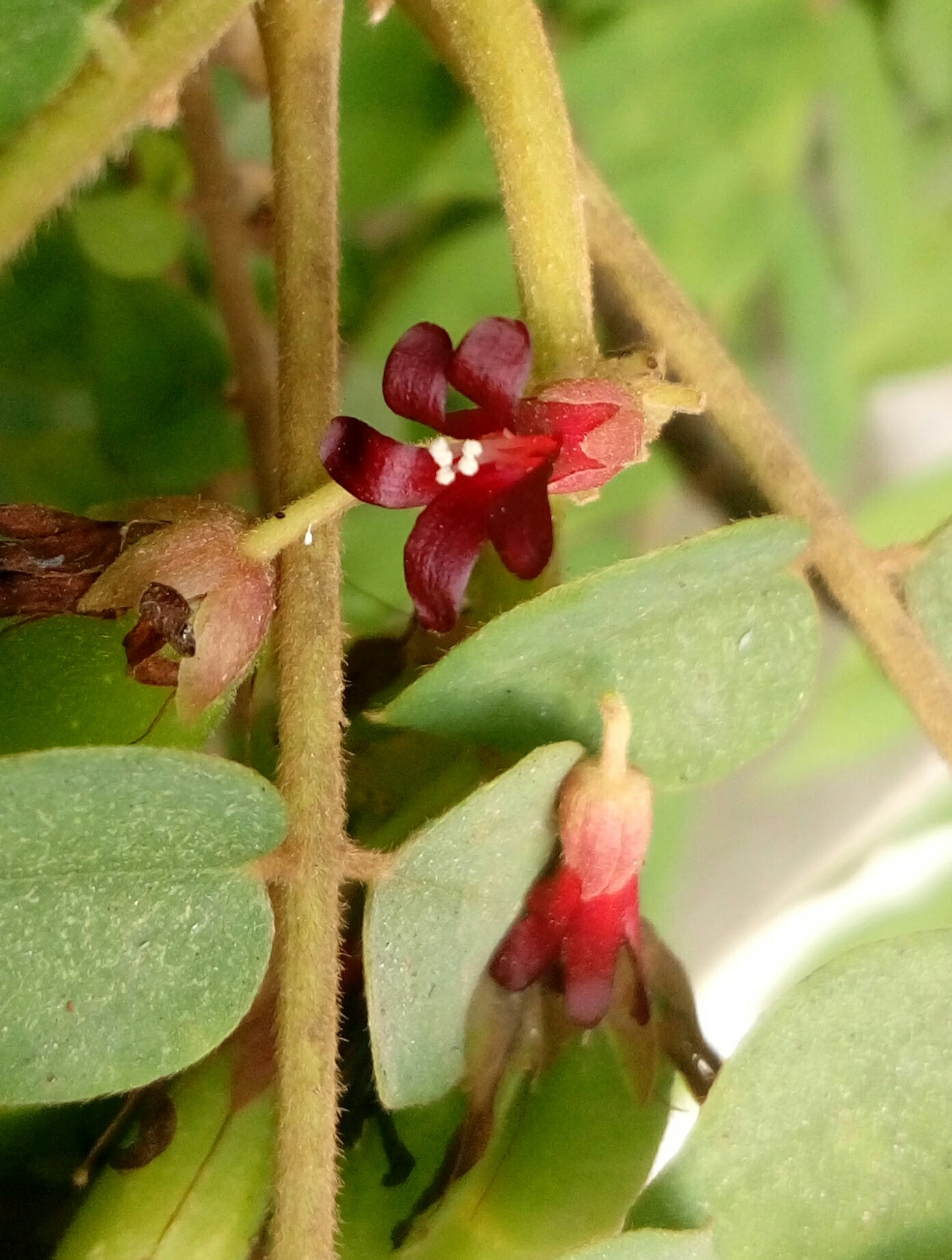
Averrhoa bilimbi flower

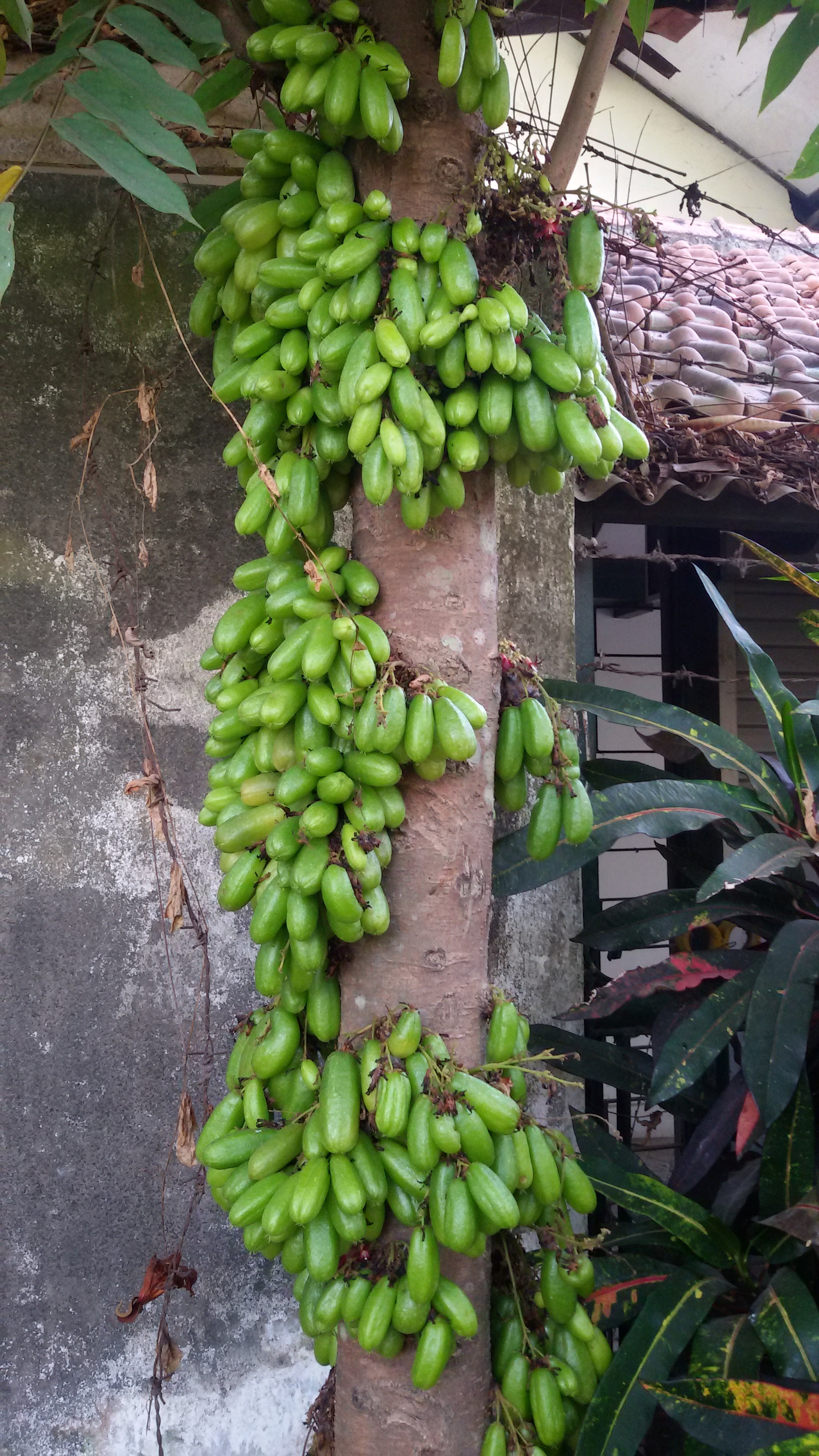
Bilimbi tree full of fruit

== See also ==
- Averrhoa carambola, a closely related tree
