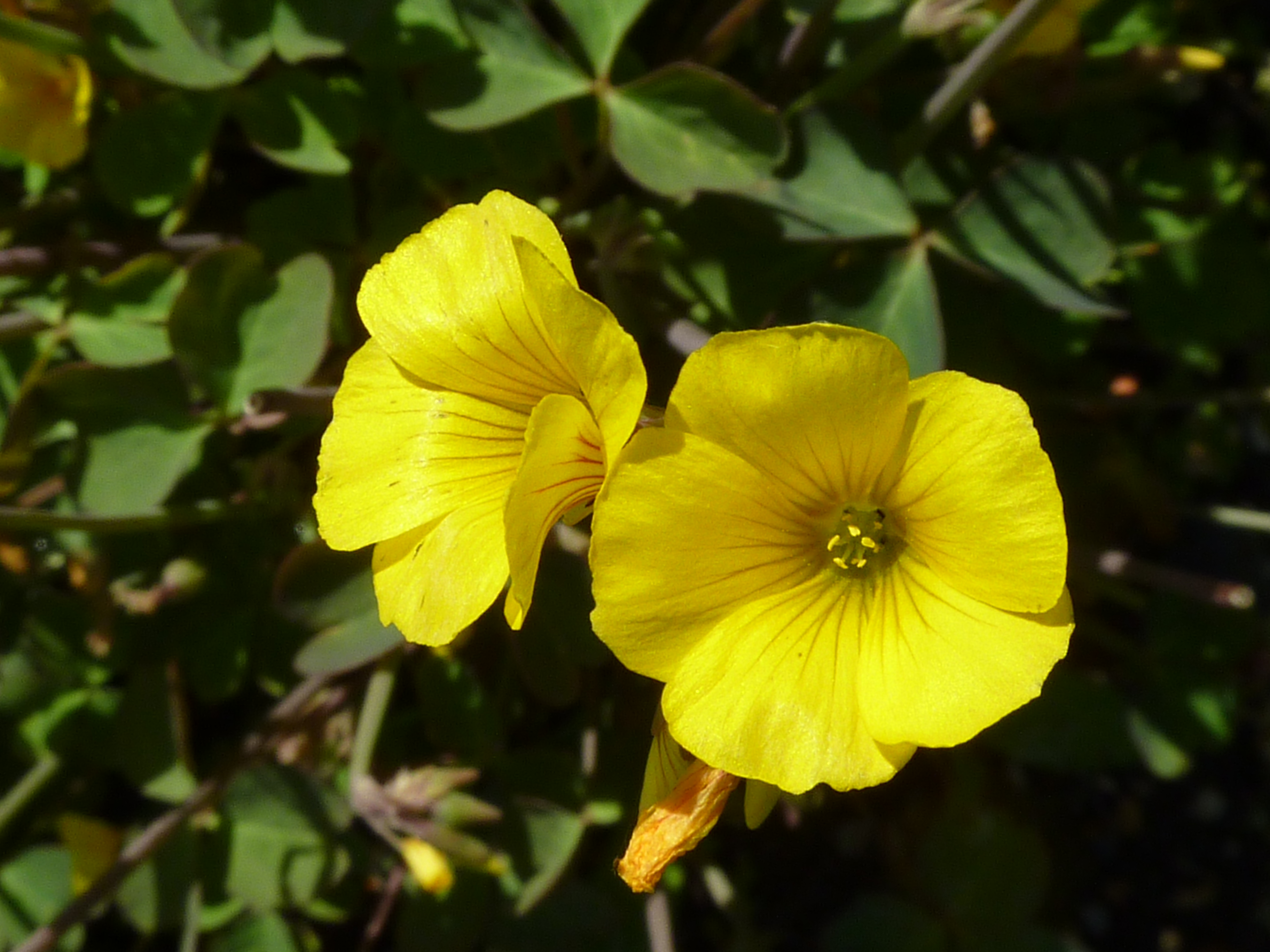

Scientific classification
- Kingdom: Plantae
- Clade: Tracheophytes
- Clade: Angiosperms
- Clade: Eudicots
- Clade: Rosids
- Order: Oxalidales
- Family: Oxalidaceae
- Genus: Oxalis
- Species: O. valdiviensis

Binomial name
- Oxalis valdiviensis Barnéoud

= Oxalis valdiviensis =

Species of flowering plant

Oxalis valdiviensis, the Chilean yellow-sorrel, is a species of flowering plant in the family Oxalidaceae. It is a perennial herb found in Chile and Argentina. In Chile, it is distributed from the Valparaisio to the Los Lagos regions.
