= Morris Arkin =

American stockbroker and horticulturist (1910–1996)

- Born: October 18, 1910
- Died: November 19, 1996 (aged 86)
- Education: George Washington University
- Occupation: Stockbroker
- Known for: Developing a star-fruit and macadamia variety, notably the Arkin Papershell (nut variety)
- Spouse: Sylvia Swerling
- Children: 3

Morris Arkin (October 18, 1910 – November 19, 1996) was a Washington D.C. native and retired stockbroker whose backyard experiments in tree propagation helped expand the market for Florida-grown star fruit and macadamia nuts.

== Early life ==
Mr. Arkin graduated from Central High School and attended what is now George Washington University. Mr. Arkin was a stage actor and later worked in real estate. He served in the U.S. Army in India during World War II. After World War II, he married Sylvia Swerling, and they lived in Washington, D.C. In 1952, they moved with their children to Coral Gables, Florida, where he worked as a stockbroker and later managed the brokerage office until 1981.

== Fruit Cultivation ==
During the late 1960s, Mr. Arkin began cultivating plants and trees in his backyard, eventually developing a variety of carambola, or star fruit, that became commercially viable and was named after him. Until the early 1970s, carambola had been grown only as specimen trees in botanical gardens and experiment stations and as a curiosity in home landscapes. However, because of its attractive star shape when cut in cross-section and yellow to golden color, it began to grow in popularity. Fruit from early introductions were however, sour and sometimes considered unpalatable. This limited market and public acceptance, inhibiting development and expansion of carambola as a commercial fresh fruit. Mr. Arkin cultivated the "Arkin" variety – a sweet carambola with good handling characteristics – in the mid to late 1970s. Soon afterward, the limited commercial area of carambola under cultivation in south Florida (4 to 12 ha) was top-worked to "Arkin" and this new cultivar led to a rapid increase in consumer demand for the fruit which further stimulated interest in establishing new commercial plantings. Today, the "Arkin" variety represents 98% of the current acreage in South Florida.

The publication Tropical Fruit News noted that he also worked to establish the "papershell" macadamia as a commercial tree for South Florida, now known as the "Arkin Papershell" variety.

He sold trees to growers in Florida.

== Death ==
Mr. Arkin worked with his trees right up until his death from a pulmonary edema and heart attack in 1996. Sylvia Arkin died in 2007. Mr. Arkin is survived by three daughters, a sister, a brother, six grandchildren, and two great-grandchildren.

== Resources ==
- Commercialization of Carambola, Atemoya, and Other Tropical Fruits in South Florida
