= Dapania =

Scientific classification
- Kingdom: Plantae
- Clade: Tracheophytes
- Clade: Angiosperms
- Clade: Eudicots
- Clade: Rosids
- Order: Oxalidales
- Family: Oxalidaceae
- Genus: Dapania; Korth.

Genus of flowering plants

Dapania pentandra Capuron

Dapania is a genus of flowering plants belonging to the family Oxalidaceae.

Its native range is Madagascar, Western Malesia.

Species:

- Dapania grandifolia Veldkamp
- Dapania pentandra Capuron
- Dapania racemosa Korth.
