= Sarcotheca =

Scientific classification
- Kingdom: Plantae
- Clade: Tracheophytes
- Clade: Angiosperms
- Clade: Eudicots
- Clade: Rosids
- Order: Oxalidales
- Family: Oxalidaceae
- Genus: Sarcotheca; Blume

Synonyms
- Connaropsis Planch. ex Hook.f.

Genus of plants

Sarcotheca is a genus of flowering plants in the family Oxalidaceae.

As of December 2023, Plants of the World Online accepts the following species:

- Sarcotheca celebica Veldkamp
- Sarcotheca diversifolia (Miq.) Hallier f.
- Sarcotheca ferruginea Merr.
- Sarcotheca glauca (Hook.f.) Hallier f.
- Sarcotheca glomerula (King) Veldkamp
- Sarcotheca griffithii (Planch.) Hallier f.
- Sarcotheca laxa (Ridl.) R.Knuth
- Sarcotheca lunduensis Veldkamp
- Sarcotheca macrophylla Blume
- Sarcotheca monophylla (Planch.) Hallier f.
- Sarcotheca ochracea Hallier f.
- Sarcotheca rubrinervis Hallier f.
