= Caramboxin =

Names
- IUPAC name 2-Carboxy-3-hydroxy-5-methoxy-L-phenylalanine
- Systematic IUPAC name 2-[(2S)-2-Amino-2-carboxyethyl]-6-hydroxy-4-methoxybenzoic acid

Identifiers
| CAS Number | 1531600-36-8 |
| 3D model (JSmol) | Interactive image |
| ChemSpider | 32779488 (±) |
| PubChem CID | 134728497 |
| UNII | 2EEY7DX8L2 |
| CompTox Dashboard (EPA) | DTXSID801045762 |
- InChI: InChI=1S/C11H13NO6/c1-18-6-2-5(3-7(12)10(14)15)9(11(16)17)8(13)4-6/h2,4,7,13H,3,12H2,1H3,(H,14,15)(H,16,17)/t7-/m0/s1 Key: DYJIDGJHOLTGBO-ZETCQYMHSA-N
- SMILES: OC(=O)c1c(O)cc(OC)cc1C[C@H](N)C(=O)O

Properties
| Chemical formula | C_{11}H_{13}NO_{6} |
| Molar mass | 255.226 g·mol^{−1} |
| Density | 1.5 ± 0.1 g/cm3 |
| Refractive index (n_{D}) | 1.625 |
- Except where otherwise noted, data are given for materials in their standard state (at 25 °C [77 °F], 100 kPa). Infobox references

Caramboxin (CBX) is a neurotoxin that is found in bilimbi (Averrhoa bilimbi) and the related star fruit (Averrhoa carambol). It is a non-proteinogenic amino acid similar to phenylalanine, but containing hydroxyl, methoxy, and carboxyl substituents on the aromatic ring. Like phenylalanine, it contains a single chiral atom, meaning that two enantiomers are possible, with the (S) form being the one found in the plant.

Star fruit also contains oxalic acid. This is also found in other food sources like cabbage, broccoli, and quinoa. Oxalic acid can react with calcium ions in blood to form calcium oxalate. Calcium oxalate can form crystals in kidney tubules which is linked to “an acute and/or chronic decrease in kidney function”. Eating too much star fruit in a short time can cause acute kidney injury (AKI) to occur, which in turn increases the risk of caramboxin doing severe damage to the body. Therefore, oxalate also influences the effect of caramboxin.

The consumption of substantial amounts of star fruit or its juice on an empty stomach is not recommended, regardless of whether individuals have a normal kidney function or not. When this happens, intense haemodialysis is used to lower the concentration of caramboxin and oxalic acid, as these are water soluble.

== Structure and synthesis ==
Naturally occurring caramboxin is present as (S)-(−)-caramboxin. Crystallographic data is not available as of yet, but Hartree-Fock and DFT calculations have been performed to uncover a proposed conformational structure of the neurotoxin. The electronegative regions of the molecule are concentrated on its heteroatoms. Some of these heteroatoms are also likely involved in intramolecular hydrogen bonding, lowering the overall conformational freedom of the caramboxin.

Caramboxin can be synthesized in either enantiomeric form, with the key stereocenter set by an enantioselective alkylation reaction using various cinchona alkaloids as a chiral catalyst.

== Molecular mechanism of action ==
Caramboxin is classified as a neurotoxin, having main effects on the central nervous system by influencing the balance of excitatory signals and inhibitory signals in neurons.

Due to caramboxin's similar structure to phenylalanine as well as glutamate and the ability to pass the blood-brain barrier, caramboxin can bind to excitatory neuroreceptors on postsynaptic neurons in the central nervous system. By the binding of caramboxin to NMDA and AMPA receptors (glutamatergic ionotropic receptors), the receptors are activated. This allows for the influx of ions resulting in a depolarization of the membrane. On top of that, when opening the membrane channel, calcium can enter the postsynaptic neuron, inducing intracellular signalling as a second messenger. This depolarization and signalling activates the neurons for signal transduction, increasing the excitatory signals in the nervous system.

Secondly, caramboxin can inhibit the binding of GABA to GABA receptors in the central nervous system, thereby being a negative regulator. By preventing the binding of GABA to its receptor, there is no hyperpolarization of the neuron after signal transduction. This results in an increase in the excitability of neurons, allowing for more signals to be passed on.

Both of the effects of caramboxin increase the excitability of neurons in the central nervous system. By influencing the balance between excitatory and inhibitory signals, neurotoxicity occurs. Symptoms as seizures, confusion, and hiccups can be experienced by the continuous excitatory signals. For patients with a renal dysfunction, elevated levels of caramboxin are found in the body, due to renal clearance being the main clearance pathway of caramboxin, causing more severe symptoms. Besides that, it is also proposed that caramboxin has neurodegenerative effects, for which the mechanism still has to be discovered.
