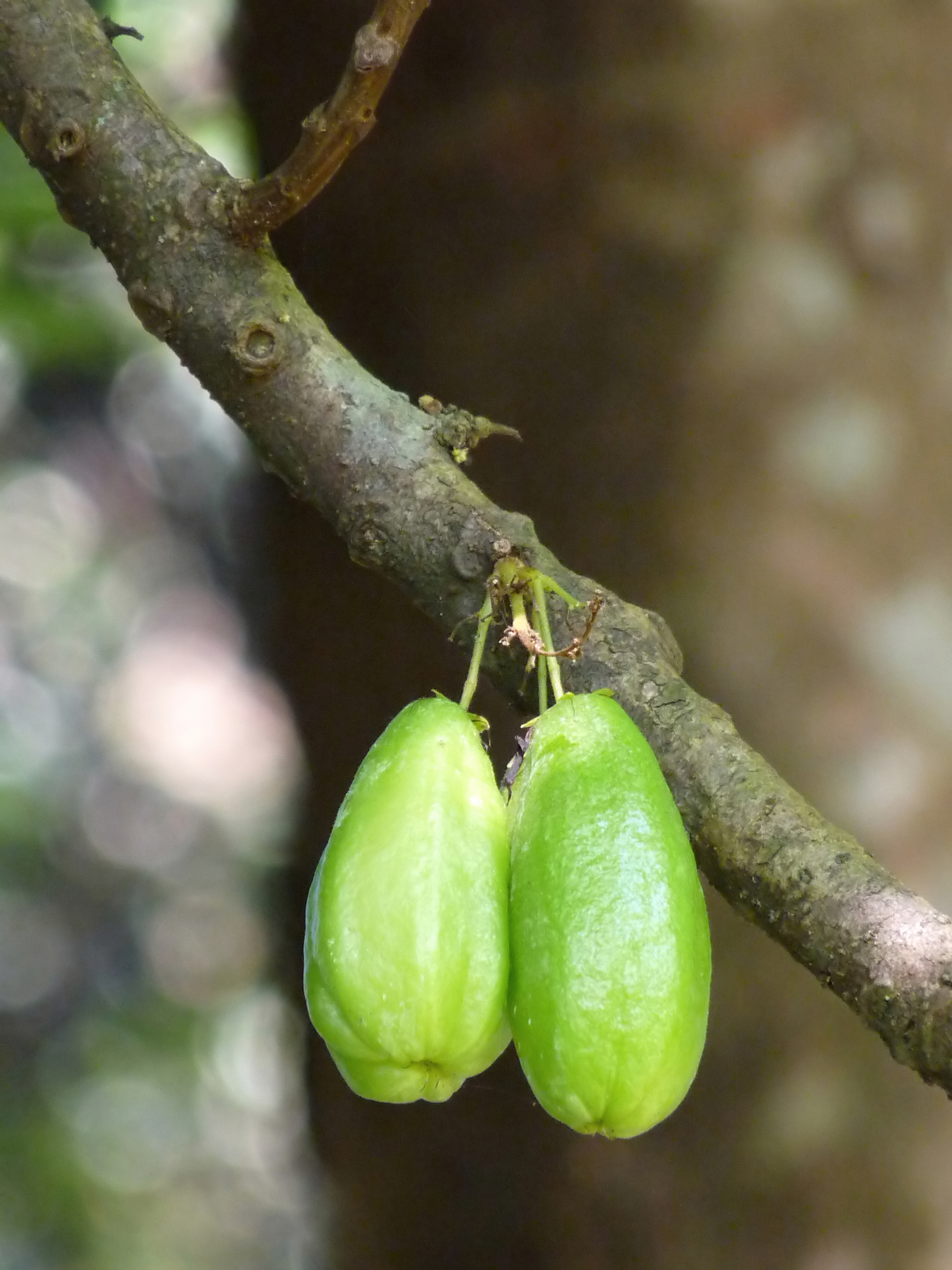
- Averrhoa bilimbi

Scientific classification
- Kingdom: Plantae
- Clade: Tracheophytes
- Clade: Angiosperms
- Clade: Eudicots
- Clade: Rosids
- Order: Oxalidales
- Family: Oxalidaceae; R.Br.

Genera
- Averrhoa; Biophytum; Dapania; Oxalis (including: Lotoxalis, Sassia, Xanthoxalis); Sarcotheca

= Oxalidaceae =

Family of flowering plants

Oxalidaceae, or the wood-sorrels family, is a family of five genera of flowering plants, with the great majority of the 570 species in the genus Oxalis. The flowers within this family tend to be perfect, and 5-parted with a superior ovary consisting of five fused carpels. Fruits of this family tend to be capsules or berries that are prominently 5-lobed such as the starfruit.

== Description ==
Oxalidaceae can be herbaceous plants, shrubs, and small trees.

=== Leaves ===
Oxalidaceae leaves tend to be pinnately veined, alternate, and clustered with well-developed petioles. The abaxial (under) side of the leaves can have trichomes. Herbaceous plants in this family tend to have their leaves in the form of a rosette.

Some leaves in genera Averrhoa and Biophytum, can be sensitive to both light and touch.

=== Flowers ===
Flowers in this family are perfect, meaning they have a calyx, corolla, gynoecium, and androecium. Oxalidaceae tend to come in parts of 5, having five sepals, five petals, and five fused carpels. The petals of Oxalidaceae flowers tend to be free, or just slightly fused at the base, appearing in red, yellow, white, purple to violet, but never blue.These plants tend to have a superior ovary, that consists of five, fused carpels. Stamens tend to be fused in Oxalidaceae plants, and in two whorls of five, where the outer whorl lines up with the petals and tends to be shorter, while the inner whorl lines up with the sepals and tends to be longer.

=== Fruit ===
Fruits within this family can vary greatly by genus. Averrhoa and Sarcotheca tend to produce berries, Dapania produce a loculicidal capsule, while Biophytum produces a schizocarp. Fruits can vary in color, but the pericarp tends to be 5-lobed, such as the starfruit (Averrhoa carambola), which is cultivated for human consumption.

== Distribution ==
Oxalidaceae can be found worldwide, with diversity centered in South Africa, South America, and East Asia, preferring tropical and subtropical climates.

== Classification ==
It was initially believed that genera Dapania, Averrhoa, and Sarcotheca were most closely related due to the woody habit of the plants in those genera, and were placed in their own family called Averrhoaceae. Oxalis and Biophytum were previously believed to be in the Geranaiceae family. However, through molecular studies, it has been determined that these genera make up the Oxalidaceae family, most closely related to the Connarceae family. These families form a monophyletic group with: Cephalotaceae, Brunelliaceae, Cunoniaceae, and Elaeocarpaceae.

Molecular studies have yet to agree on the phylogeny of the genera within this family, however most agree that Oxalis is a basal genus, with a 2024 by the Board of the Botanic Garden & State Herbarium of South Australia study placing it in the subfamily Oxalidoideae. This same study places the rest of the genera in this family in the subfamily Averrhoideae. Due to a lack of sampling and genetic modeling conducted on the other genera within this family, there is not much consensus on the genus phylogeny. Some studies state a closer relationship between Averrhoa and Sarcotheca, while others show a closer relationship between Averrhoa and Dapania. These studies do agree however that Biophytum is more closely related to Averrhoa, than it is to Oxalis.

The currently accepted phylogeny by the Royal Botanic Gardens Tree of Life shows the phylogeny of Oxalidaceae, as seen below.

- Oxalidaceae
  - - Biophytum
    - - Dapania
      - - Sarcotheca
        - Averrhoa
  - Oxalis

== Uses ==
Plants from this family have been used in traditional Chinese medicine. Specific species include: Averrhoa carambola, Biophytum sensitivum, Oxalis acetosella subsp. griffithi, and Oxalis corniculata.

== Gallery ==
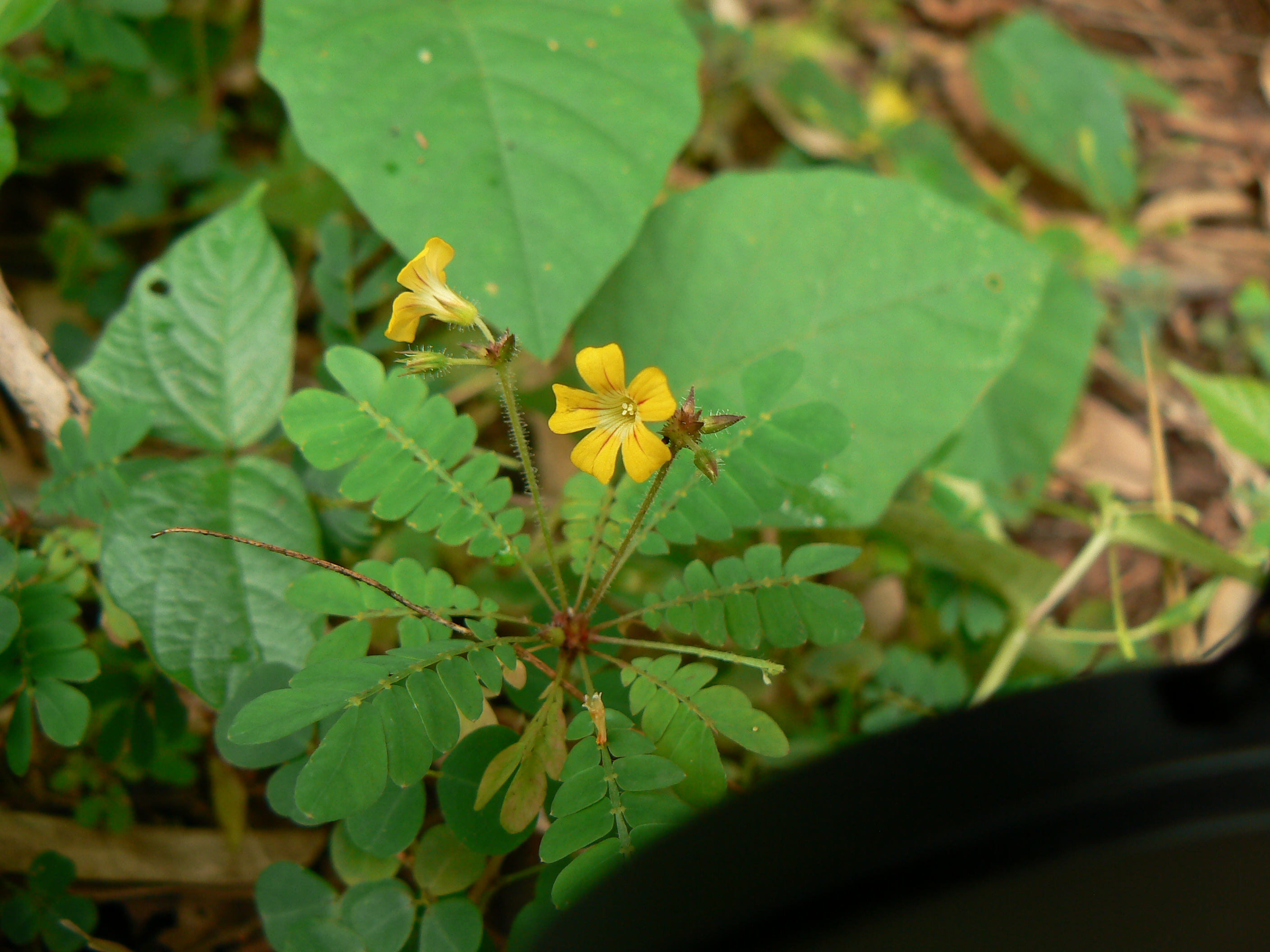
Biophytum sensitivum flowers and leaves

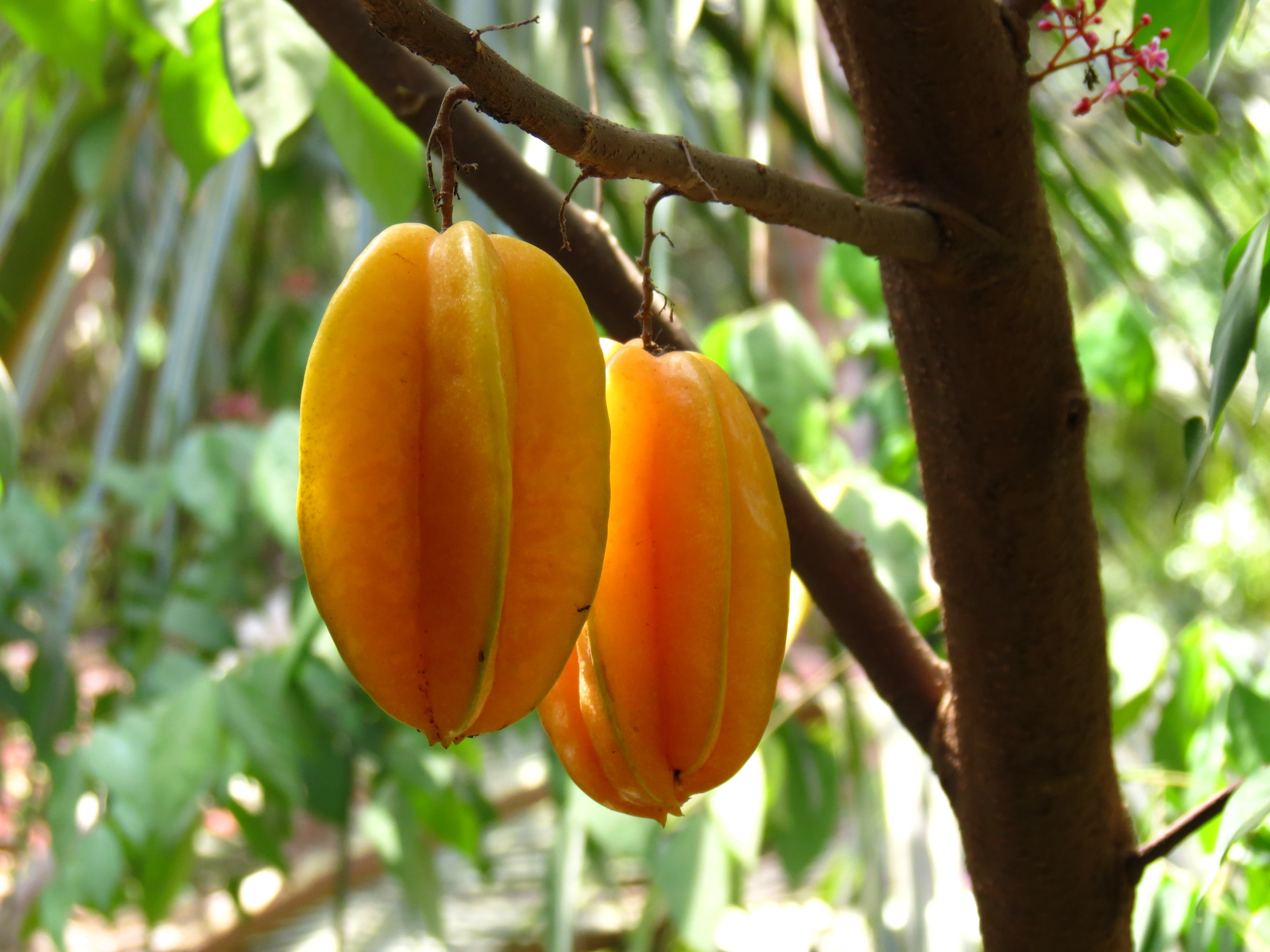
Averrhoa carambola fruit

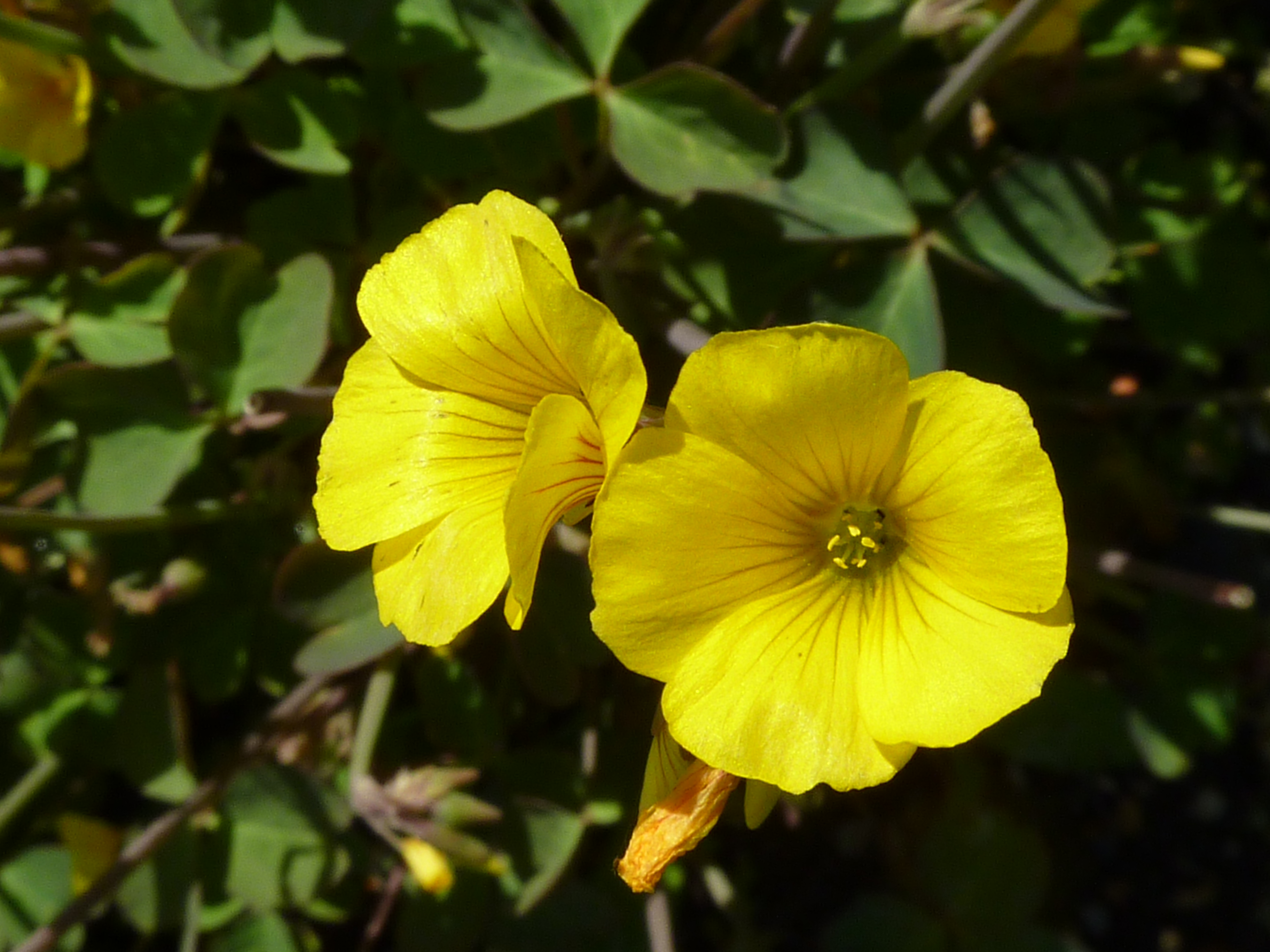
Oxalis valdiviensis flowers

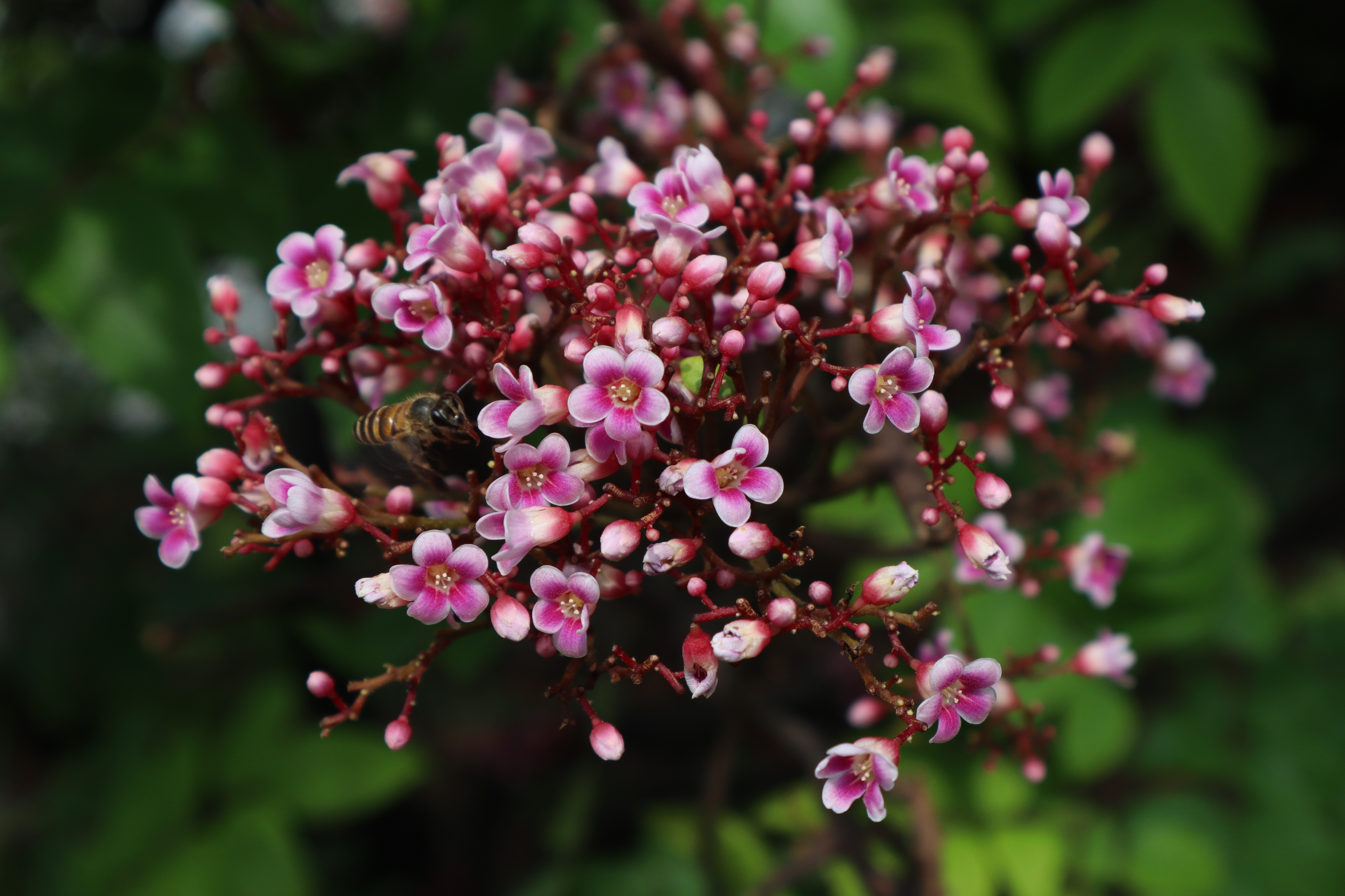
Averrhoa carambola flowers
