= List of Pandanales of South Africa =

Flowering plants in the order Pandanales recorded from South Africa

Pandanales is an order of flowering plants placed in the monocot clade in the Angiosperm Phylogeny Group and Angiosperm Phylogeny Web systems. Within the monocots Pandanales are grouped in the lilioid monocots where they are in a sister group relationship with the Dioscoreales. Historically the order has consisted of a number of different families in different systems but modern classification of the order is based primarily on molecular phylogenetics despite diverse morphology which previously placed many of the families in other groupings based on apparent similarity. Members of the order have a subtropical distribution and includes trees, shrubs, vines, and herbaceous plants. The order consists of 5 families, 36 genera and about 1,610 species.

The anthophytes are a grouping of plant taxa bearing flower-like reproductive structures. They were formerly thought to be a clade comprising plants bearing flower-like structures. The group contained the angiosperms - the extant flowering plants, such as roses and grasses - as well as the Gnetales and the extinct Bennettitales.

23,420 species of vascular plant have been recorded in South Africa, making it the sixth most species-rich country in the world and the most species-rich country on the African continent. Of these, 153 species are considered to be threatened. Nine biomes have been described in South Africa: Fynbos, Succulent Karoo, desert, Nama Karoo, grassland, savanna, Albany thickets, the Indian Ocean coastal belt, and forests.

The 2018 South African National Biodiversity Institute's National Biodiversity Assessment plant checklist lists 35,130 taxa in the phyla Anthocerotophyta (hornworts (6)), Anthophyta (flowering plants (33534)), Bryophyta (mosses (685)), Cycadophyta (cycads (42)), Lycopodiophyta (Lycophytes(45)), Marchantiophyta (liverworts (376)), Pinophyta (conifers (33)), and Pteridophyta (cryptogams (408)).

One family is represented in the literature. Listed taxa include species, subspecies, varieties, and forms as recorded, some of which have subsequently been allocated to other taxa as synonyms, in which cases the accepted taxon is appended to the listing. Multiple entries under alternative names reflect taxonomic revision over time.

== Velloziaceae ==
- Family: Velloziaceae,

=== Barbacenia ===
Genus Barbacenia:

- Barbacenia elegans (Balf.) Pax, accepted as Xerophyta elegans (Balf.) Baker
- Barbacenia equisetoides (Baker) R.E.Fr. accepted as Xerophyta equisetoides Baker
- Barbacenia humilis (Baker) Pax ex Burtt Davy & R.Pott, accepted as Xerophyta humilis (Baker) T.Durand & Schinz
- Barbacenia minuta (Baker) Dinter, accepted as Xerophyta humilis (Baker) T.Durand & Schinz
- Barbacenia retinervis (Baker) Pax ex Burtt Davy & R.Pott, accepted as Xerophyta retinervis Baker var. retinervis
- Barbacenia rosea (Baker) Pax ex Burtt Davy & R.Pott, accepted as Xerophyta rosea (Baker) N.L.Menezes
- Barbacenia schlechteri (Baker) Burtt Davy & R.Pott, accepted as Xerophyta schlechteri (Baker) N.L.Menezes
- Barbacenia villosa (Baker) Pax ex Burtt Davy & R.Pott, accepted as Xerophyta villosa (Baker) L.B.Sm. & Ayensu [1], indigenous
- Barbacenia viscosa (Baker) Pax ex Burtt Davy & R.Pott, accepted as Xerophyta viscosa Baker
- Barbacenia wentzeliana Harms, accepted as Xerophyta wentzeliana (Harms) Solch var. wentzeliana
  - Barbacenia wentzeliana Harms var. rhodesiana R.E.Fr. accepted as Xerophyta wentzeliana (Harms) Solch var. wentzeliana

=== Talbotia ===
Genus Talbotia:

- Talbotia elegans Balf. accepted as Xerophyta elegans (Balf.) Baker, endemic

=== Vellozia ===
Genus Vellozia:

- Vellozia clavata (Baker) Baker, accepted as Xerophyta retinervis Baker var. retinervis
- Vellozia elegans (Balf.) Oliv. ex Hook.f. accepted as Xerophyta elegans (Balf.) Baker
- Vellozia elegans (Balf.) Oliv. ex Hook.f. var. minor Baker, accepted as Xerophyta elegans (Balf.) Baker, indigenous
- Vellozia equisetoides (Baker) Baker, accepted as Xerophyta equisetoides Baker, indigenous
- Vellozia humilis Baker, accepted as Xerophyta humilis (Baker) T.Durand & Schinz
- Vellozia minuta Baker, accepted as Xerophyta humilis (Baker) T.Durand & Schinz
- Vellozia retinervis (Baker) Baker, accepted as Xerophyta retinervis Baker var. retinervis
- Vellozia rosea Baker, accepted as Xerophyta rosea (Baker) N.L.Menezes
- Vellozia schlechteri Baker, accepted as Xerophyta schlechteri (Baker) N.L.Menezes
- Vellozia suaveolens Greves, accepted as Xerophyta suaveolens (Greves) N.L.Menezes var. suaveolens
- Vellozia talbotii Balf. accepted as Xerophyta elegans (Balf.) Baker
- Vellozia villosa Baker, accepted as Xerophyta villosa (Baker) L.B.Sm. & Ayensu [1], indigenous
- Vellozia viscosa (Baker) Baker, accepted as Xerophyta viscosa Baker
- Vellozia wentzeliana (Harms) Greves, accepted as Xerophyta wentzeliana (Harms) Solch var. wentzeliana

=== Xerophyta ===
Genus Xerophyta:

- Xerophyta adendorffii Behnke, endemic
- Xerophyta bakeri T.Durand & Schinz, accepted as Xerophyta villosa (Baker) L.B.Sm. & Ayensu [1]
- Xerophyta clavata Baker, accepted as Xerophyta retinervis Baker var. retinervis, indigenous
- Xerophyta elegans (Balf.) Baker, endemic
- Xerophyta equisetoides Baker, indigenous
  - Xerophyta equisetoides Baker var. pauciramosa L.B.Sm. & Ayensu, accepted as Xerophyta pauciramosa (L.B.Sm. & Ayensu) Behnke, indigenous
  - Xerophyta equisetoides Baker var. pubescens L.B.Sm. & Ayensu, accepted as Xerophyta wentzeliana (Harms) Solch var. wentzeliana
  - Xerophyta equisetoides Baker var. setosa L.B.Sm. & Ayensu, accepted as Xerophyta equisetoides Baker
- Xerophyta humilis (Baker) T.Durand & Schinz, indigenous
- Xerophyta junodii Behnke, endemic
- Xerophyta longicaulis Hilliard, endemic
- Xerophyta melleri Baker, accepted as Xerophyta equisetoides Baker
- Xerophyta miniata T.Durand & Schinz, accepted as Xerophyta elegans (Balf.) Baker
- Xerophyta minuta Baker, accepted as Xerophyta elegans (Balf.) Baker
- Xerophyta mollissima Schinz, accepted as Xerophyta villosa (Baker) L.B.Sm. & Ayensu [1]
- Xerophyta pauciramosa (L.B.Sm. & Ayensu) Behnke, indigenous
- Xerophyta purpurascens Behnke, endemic
- Xerophyta rehmannii Behnke, endemic
- Xerophyta retinervis Baker, indigenous
  - Xerophyta retinervis Baker var. equisetoides (Baker) Coetzee, accepted as Xerophyta equisetoides Baker
  - Xerophyta retinervis Baker var. multiramosa Behnke, endemic
  - Xerophyta retinervis Baker var. retinervis, indigenous
  - Xerophyta retinervis Baker var. wentzeliana (Harms) Coetzee, accepted as Xerophyta wentzeliana (Harms) Solch var. wentzeliana
- Xerophyta rosea (Baker) N.L.Menezes, endemic
- Xerophyta schlechteri (Baker) N.L.Menezes, indigenous
- Xerophyta suaveolens (Greves) N.L.Menezes, indigenous
  - Xerophyta suaveolens (Greves) N.L.Menezes var. suaveolens, indigenous
- Xerophyta vallispongolana J.E.Burrows, S.M.Burrows & Behnke, endemic
- Xerophyta villosa (Baker) L.B.Sm. & Ayensu, indigenous
- Xerophyta viscosa Baker, indigenous
