= Heinz Dietmar Behnke =

German botanist (born 1937)

Heinz-Dietmar Behnke
- Born: 1937 (age 88–89)
- Other names: H.-Dietmar Behnke; H.-D. Behnke
- Known for: Ultrastructure of sieve element plastids and its use in angiosperm classification; systematics of Caryophyllales and Velloziaceae
- Scientific career
- Fields: Botany, plant systematics, plant cell biology
- Workplaces: Heidelberg University
- Author abbrev. (botany): Behnke

Heinz-Dietmar Behnke (born 1937), usually published as H.-Dietmar Behnke, is a German botanist and professor at Heidelberg University. He is known for using transmission electron microscopy of the plastids found in phloem sieve elements as a character in the classification of flowering plants, and for his work on the systematics of the Caryophyllales and the monocot family Velloziaceae.

== Career ==
Behnke has spent his career at Heidelberg University, where he is listed as a professor in the Faculty of Biology. His later publications give his affiliation as the plant cell biology group (Pflanzliche Zellbiologie) of the Centre for Organismal Studies at Heidelberg.

== Research ==
=== Sieve-element plastids ===
Beginning in the late 1960s, Behnke studied the fine structure of plastids in the sieve tubes of flowering plants. In a series of German-language papers he described sieve-tube plastids in groups such as the monocotyledons, the Caryophyllales and the Aristolochiaceae. His review in The Botanical Review, "Sieve-tube plastids in relation to angiosperm systematics: an attempt towards a classification by ultrastructural analysis", proposed sorting plastids into types, most broadly S-type (starch-accumulating) and P-type (protein-accumulating), and using their distribution as evidence of relationships between plant families. He later extended the survey to the dicotyledons as a whole and to the evolution of the monocotyledons.

=== Caryophyllales ===
P-type plastids with a characteristic ring of protein filaments became one of the defining features of the Caryophyllales (formerly Centrospermae). With Tom J. Mabry and others, Behnke used plastid type together with betalain pigments to place disputed genera such as Gisekia and Dysphania. He also reported P-type plastids in tribes of the Polygonaceae, strengthening the link between that family and the Caryophyllales. Behnke and Mabry edited the 1994 Springer volume Caryophyllales: Evolution and Systematics, which brought together molecular, phytochemical, ultrastructural and morphological evidence on the order. In 1997 he named the family Sarcobataceae, segregating the North American genus Sarcobatus (greasewood) from the Chenopodiaceae.

=== Velloziaceae ===
From the late 1990s Behnke turned to the Velloziaceae, a monocot family of drought-tolerant plants in South America, Africa and Madagascar. A 2000 study combining sieve-element plastids with rbcL sequence data supported the family as monophyletic and identified Acanthochlamydaceae as its sister group. He described Xerophyta seinei from Zimbabwe in 2002 and, with colleagues, published a revision of the African Velloziaceae in 2013 based on leaf anatomy and rbcL sequences, in which several new species of Xerophyta were described.

== Selected publications ==
- Behnke, H.-Dietmar (1972). "Sieve-tube plastids in relation to angiosperm systematics: an attempt towards a classification by ultrastructural analysis". The Botanical Review. 38: 155–197. doi:10.1007/BF02872355.
- Behnke, H.-Dietmar; Mabry, Tom J., eds. (1994). Caryophyllales: Evolution and Systematics. Springer. doi:10.1007/978-3-642-78220-6. ISBN 978-3-642-78222-0.
- Behnke, H.-Dietmar; et al. (2000). "Systematics and evolution of Velloziaceae, with special reference to sieve-element plastids and rbcL sequence data". Botanical Journal of the Linnean Society. 134 (1–2): 93–129. doi:10.1111/j.1095-8339.2000.tb02347.x.
- Behnke, H.-Dietmar; et al. (2013). "A revision of African Velloziaceae based on leaf anatomy characters and rbcL nucleotide sequences". Botanical Journal of the Linnean Society. 172 (1): 22–94. doi:10.1111/boj.12018.
