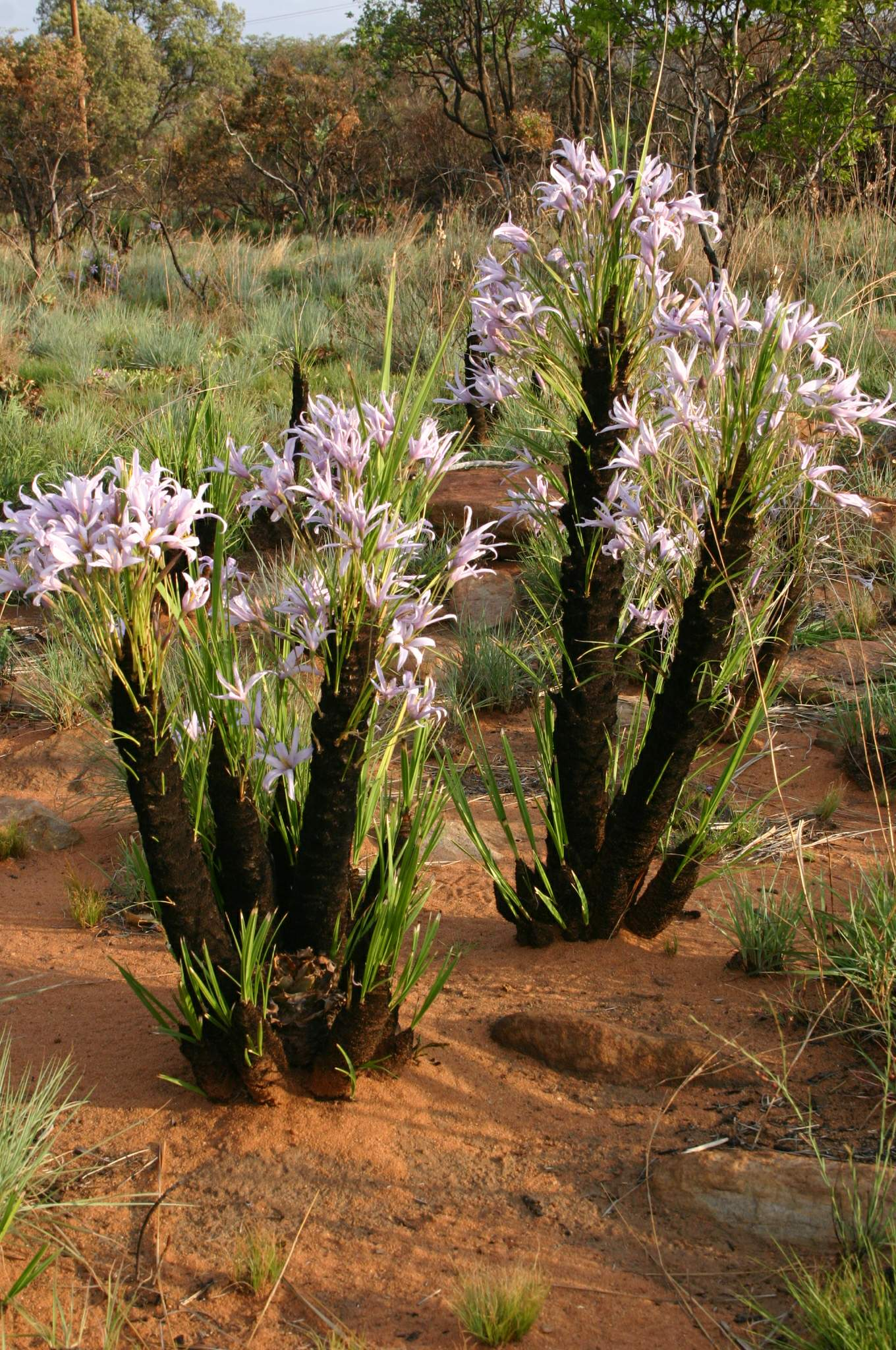
- Xerophyta retinervis

Scientific classification
- Kingdom: Plantae
- Clade: Embryophytes
- Clade: Tracheophytes
- Clade: Angiosperms
- Clade: Monocots
- Order: Pandanales
- Family: Velloziaceae
- Genus: Xerophyta; Juss. (1789)

= Xerophyta =

Genus of flowering plants

Xerophyta is a genus of flowering plants in the family Velloziaceae. It was named in 1789 by de Jussieu. It is native to Africa, Madagascar, and the Arabian Peninsula.

Some species in this genus are poikilochlorophyllous plants. This means that during dry climatic conditions, they lose chlorophyll and cease photosynthesis and transpiration. Thus they are extremely tolerant of desiccation . Hence the name Xerophyta, from Ancient Greek ξηρός (xeros, "dry") and φυτά (phutá), plural of φυτόν (phutón, “plant”).

Sequencing of the genome of Xerophyta viscosa allowed to propose that the mechanism of desiccation tolerance in these plants is achieved by employing the genetic repertoire used by desiccation-tolerant seeds.

Species

- Xerophyta acuminata
- Xerophyta adendorffii
- Xerophyta andringitrensis
- Xerophyta arabica
- Xerophyta argentea
- Xerophyta capillaris
- Xerophyta concolor
- Xerophyta connata
- Xerophyta dasylirioides
- Xerophyta demeesmaekeriana
- Xerophyta eglandulosa
- Xerophyta elegans
- Xerophyta equisetoides
- Xerophyta eylesii
- Xerophyta goetzei
- Xerophyta hereroensis
- Xerophyta humilis
- Xerophyta kirkii
- Xerophyta longicaulis
- Xerophyta monroi
- Xerophyta nutans
- Xerophyta pectinata
- Xerophyta pinifolia
- Xerophyta retinervis
- Xerophyta rippsteinii
- Xerophyta rosea
- Xerophyta scabrida
- Xerophyta schlechteri
- Xerophyta schnizleinia
- Xerophyta seinei
- Xerophyta sessiliflora
- Xerophyta simulans
- Xerophyta spekei
- Xerophyta splendens
- Xerophyta squarrosa
- Xerophyta stenophylla
- Xerophyta suaveolens
- Xerophyta trichophylla
- Xerophyta tulearensis
- Xerophyta velutina
- Xerophyta villosa
- Xerophyta viscosa
- Xerophyta wentzeliana
- Xerophyta zambiana

formerly included

moved to other genera: Barbaceniopsis Nanuza Vellozia

- X. abietina - Vellozia abietina
- X. boliviensis - Barbaceniopsis boliviensis
- X. cinerascens - Vellozia cinerascens
- X. minima - Vellozia minima
- X. plicata - Nanuza plicata
- X. pohliana - Vellozia minima
- X. pulchra - Vellozia pulchra
- X. sellowii - Vellozia sellowii
- X. taxifolia - Vellozia taxifolia
- X. tragacantha - Vellozia tragacantha
- X. triquetra - Nanuza plicata
- X. vargasiana - Barbaceniopsis vargasiana

== See also ==
- Resurrection plant
