= Talbotia =

Talbotia may refer to:

- Talbotia (plant), a monotypic genus of monocotyledonous flowering plants
- Pieris (butterfly) or Talbotia, a genus of butterflies
