= Behnke =

Behnke is a surname originating from west Prussia and the western part of Pomerania, which is now modern north west Poland and north east Germany.

== People ==
- Albert R. Behnke (1903–1992), American physician
- Bev Behnke, American curler
- Elmer Behnke (1929–2018), American basketball player
- Gerhard Behnke (1910–1962), German Wehrmacht officer
- Gunther Behnke (born 1963), retired German basketball player
- Heinrich Behnke (1898–1979), German mathematician
- Heinrich Behnke (Medal of Honor) (1882–1952), United States Navy seaman who received the Medal of Honor
- Heinz Behnke (1919–2002), German Wehrmacht officer
- Heinz Dietmar Behnke (born 1937), German botanist
- Julia Behnke (born 1993), German handball player
- Robert E. Behnke (1932–1999), Democratic assemblyman
- Robert J. Behnke (1929–2013), American fisheries biologist
- Stephen H. Behnke (born 1958), former Director of Ethics Office of the American Psychological

== See also ==
- Benke
- Behncke
- Benkei
