= Vellozia andina =

Scientific classification
- Kingdom: Plantae
- Clade: Tracheophytes
- Clade: Angiosperms
- Clade: Monocots
- Order: Pandanales
- Family: Velloziaceae
- Genus: Vellozia
- Species: V. andina

Binomial name
- Vellozia andina Ibisch, Vásquez & Nowicki, 2001

Species of subtropical flowering plant

Vellozia andina is a species of plant in the order Pandanales.

== Distribution ==
The plant is native to the Central Andes mountains, within the Department of Santa Cruz, in Bolivia, South America.

== Description ==
It is distinguished by its short, stout and trigonous stems and by the irregular pollen aggregates of more than eight grains.

It is a poikilohydrous and poikilochlorophyllous type of resurrection plant.
