= Xerophyta scabrida =

Scientific classification
- Kingdom: Plantae
- Clade: Tracheophytes
- Clade: Angiosperms
- Clade: Monocots
- Order: Pandanales
- Family: Velloziaceae
- Genus: Xerophyta
- Species: X. scabrida

Binomial name
- Xerophyta scabrida (Pax) T. Durand. & Schinz. (1895)

Species of flowering plant

Xerophyta scabrida is a plant species in the genus Xerophyta found in Africa. It is a poikilochlorophyllous plant which is desiccation tolerant.
