= Behncke =

Behncke is a surname. Notable people with the surname include:

- Isabel Behncke, Chilean primatologist
- Matt Behncke (born 1980), American soccer player
- Paul Behncke (1869–1937), Imperial German Navy admiral

== See also ==
- Benke
- Behnke
- Benkei
