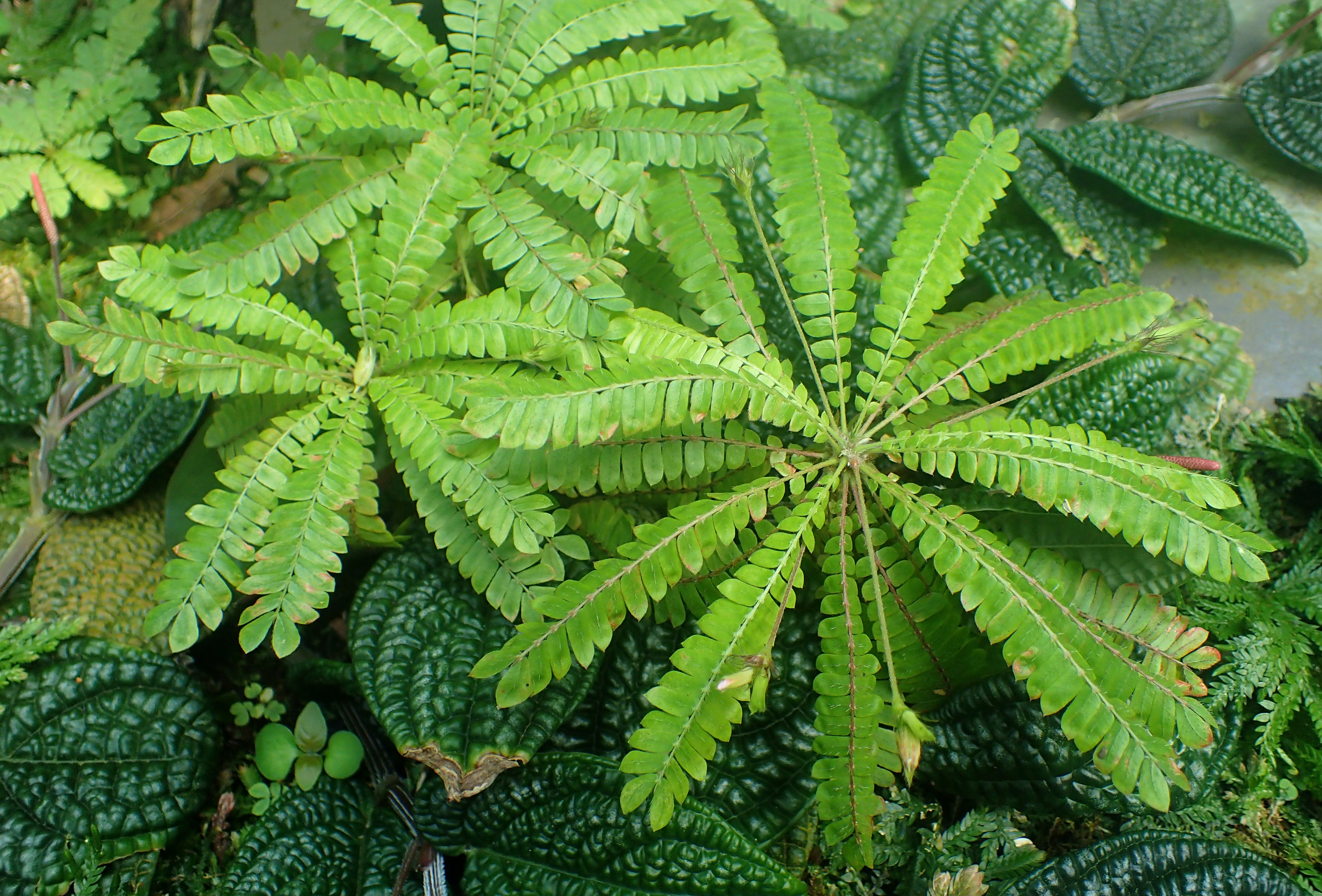

Scientific classification
- Kingdom: Plantae
- Clade: Tracheophytes
- Clade: Angiosperms
- Clade: Eudicots
- Clade: Rosids
- Order: Oxalidales
- Family: Oxalidaceae
- Genus: Biophytum
- Species: B. sensitivum

Binomial name
- Biophytum sensitivum (L.) DC.

Synonyms
- Oxalis sensitiva L. Oxalis cumingiana Turcz. Biophytum cumingii Klotzsch

= Biophytum sensitivum =

Species of flowering plant

Biophytum sensitivum, also known as little tree plant, or Mukkutti (in Malayalam) is a species of plant in the genus Biophytum of the family Oxalidaceae. It is commonly found in Kerala, wet lands of Nepal, tropical India and in other Southeast Asian countries and is used for medicinal purposes in Nepal and India. The plant is also a common weed in disturbed environments, but in captivity, Biophytum sensitivum is particularly sensitive to spider mites. Investigations have been undertaken into the plant's chemistry, biological activities, and medicinal uses. Similarly to Mimosa pudica, the leaflets of Biophytum sensitivum are able to move rapidly in response to mechanical stimulation such as touch.

== Uses ==
Chemical analyses have shown that the plant parts are rich in compounds such as amentoflavone, cupressuflavone, and isoorientin. Its extracts are traditionally believed to be antibacterial, anti-inflammatory, antioxidant, antitumor, radioprotective, chemoprotective, antiangiogenetic, wound-healing, immunomodulatory, anti-diabetic, and cardioprotective in nature.

== Gallery ==
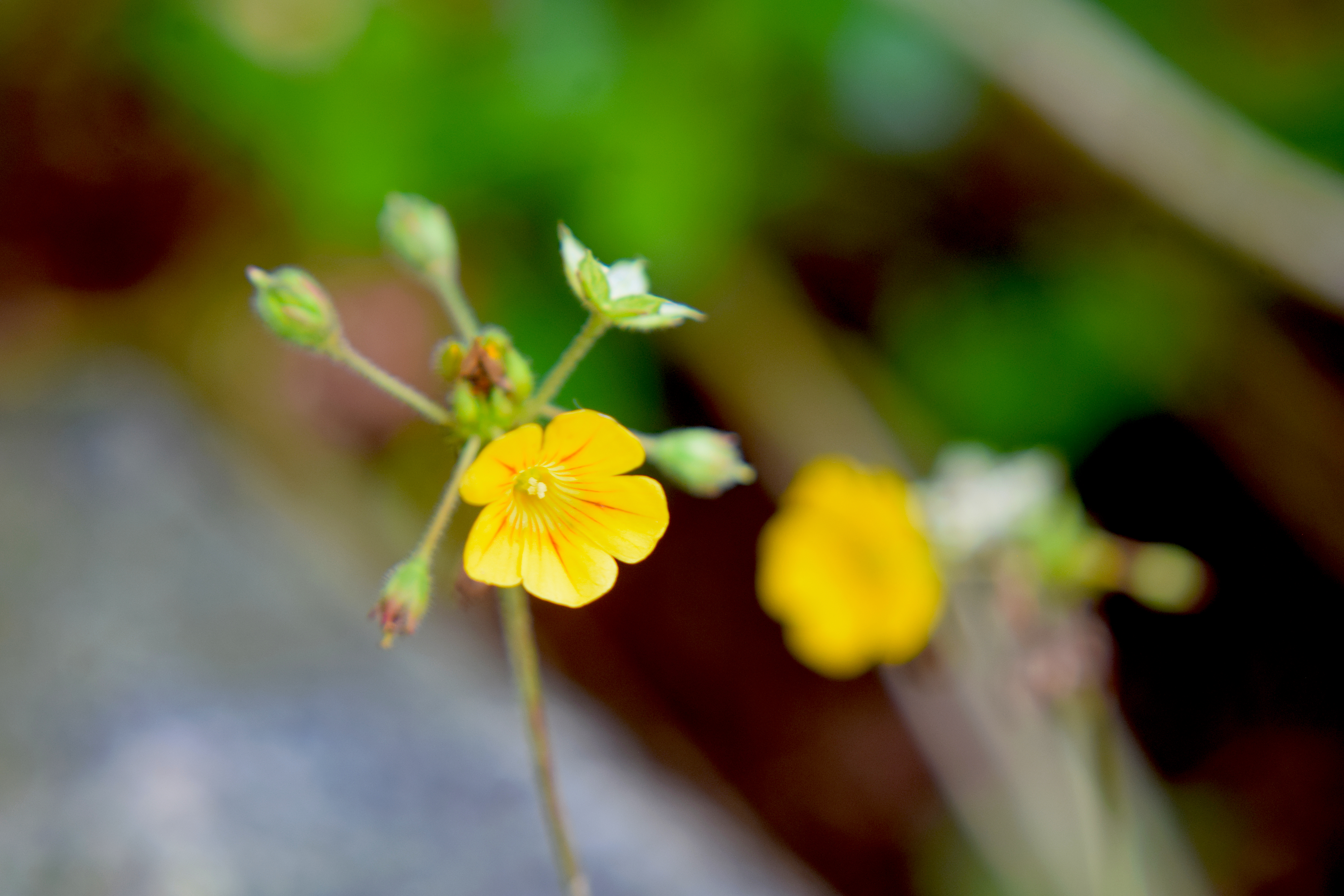
Flower

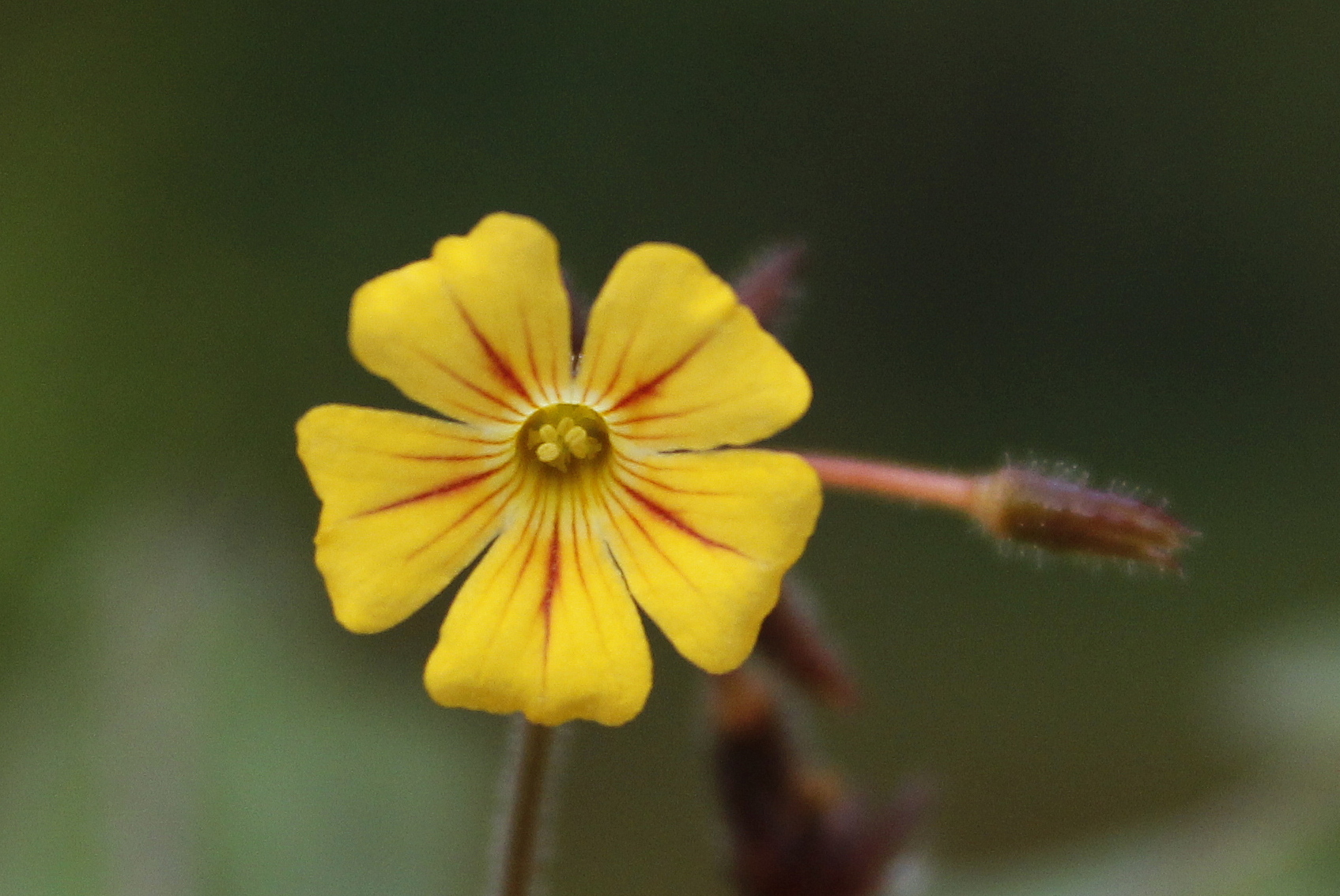
Flower

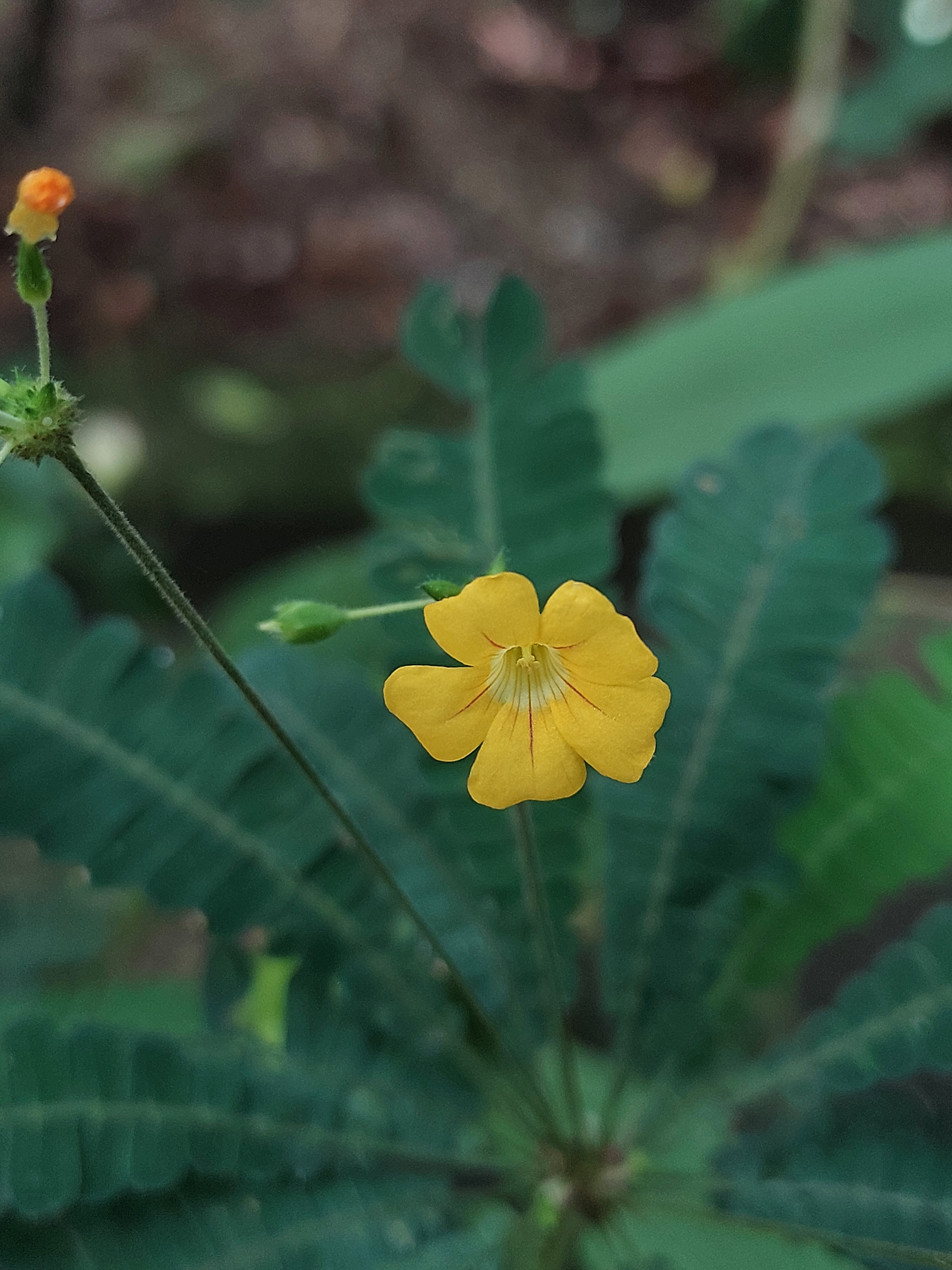
Plant

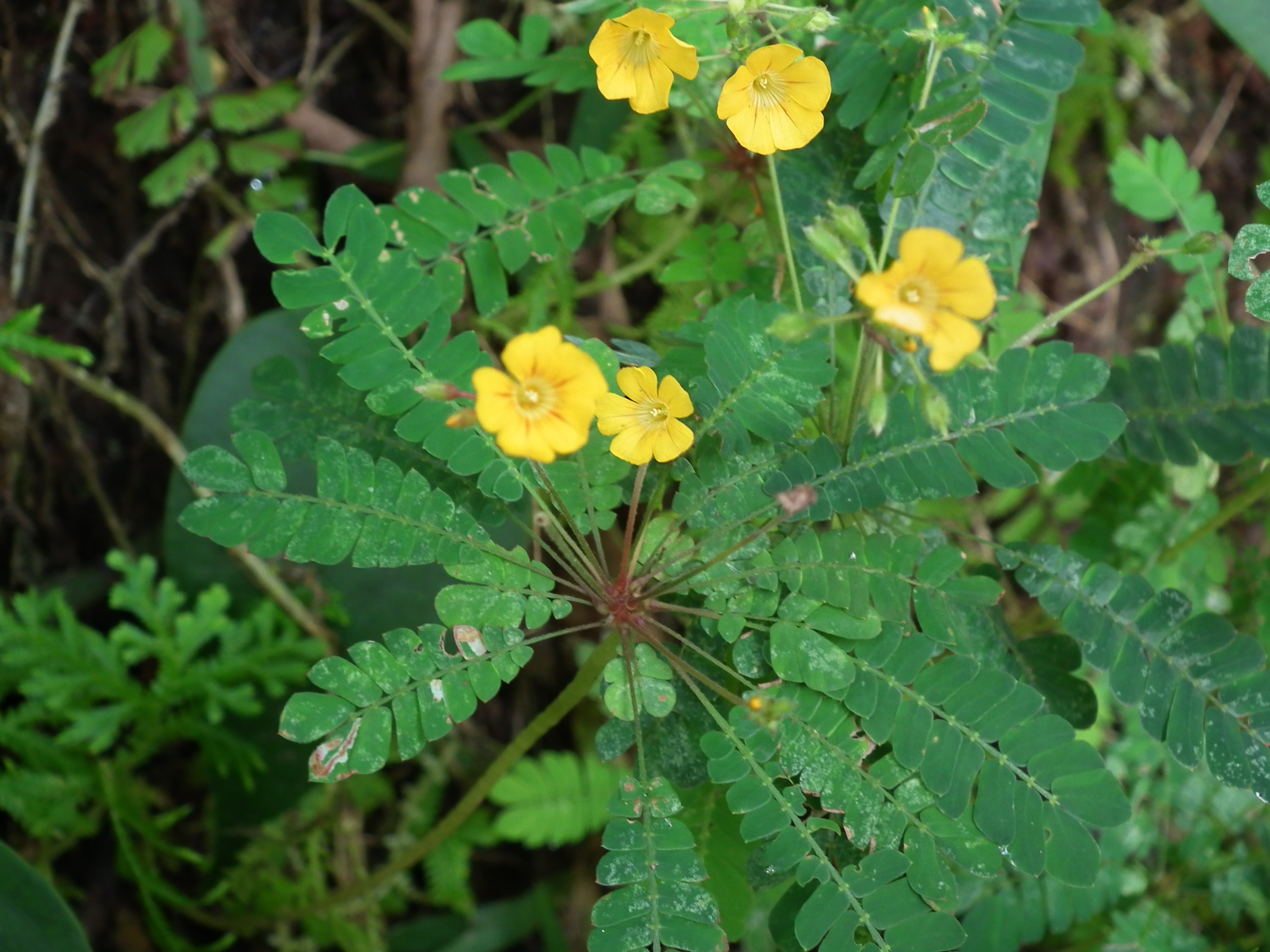
Plant
