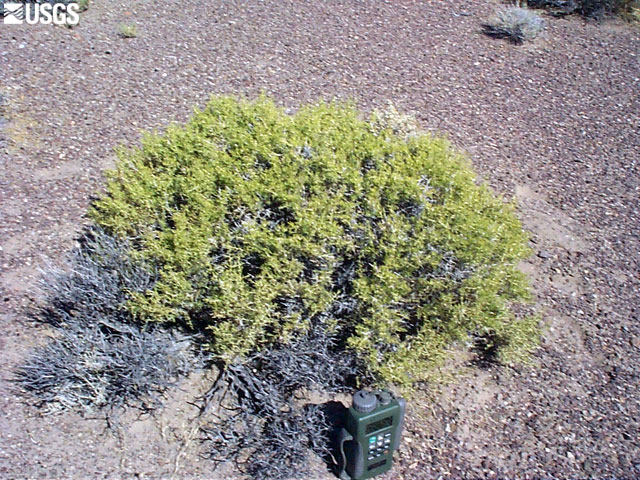
- S. baileyi

Scientific classification
- Kingdom: Plantae
- Clade: Tracheophytes
- Clade: Angiosperms
- Clade: Eudicots
- Order: Caryophyllales
- Family: Sarcobataceae; Behnke
- Genus: Sarcobatus; Nees

Species
- See text

Synonyms
- Fremontia Torr.

= Sarcobatus =

Genus of flowering plants

Sarcobatus is a North American genus of two species of flowering plants, formerly considered to be a single species. Common names for S. vermiculatus include greasewood, seepwood, and saltbush. Traditionally, Sarcobatus has been treated in the family Chenopodiaceae, but the APG III system of 2009 recognizes it as the sole genus in the family Sarcobataceae.

== Name ==
In Greek, sarco means 'fleshy' (probably in reference to the fleshy leaves) and batus means 'bramble' (referring to the spiny branches).

== Description ==
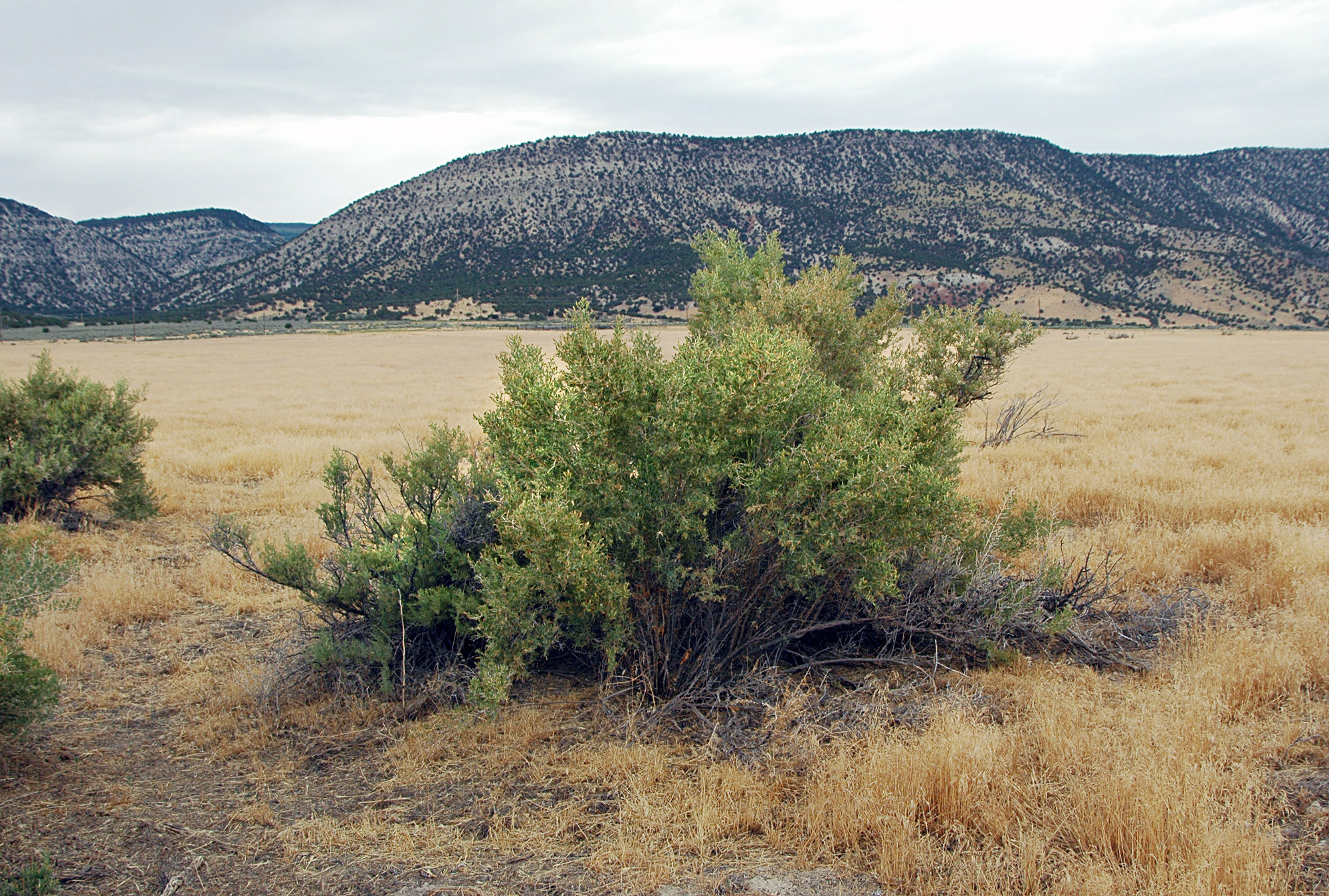
Sarcobatus vermiculatus

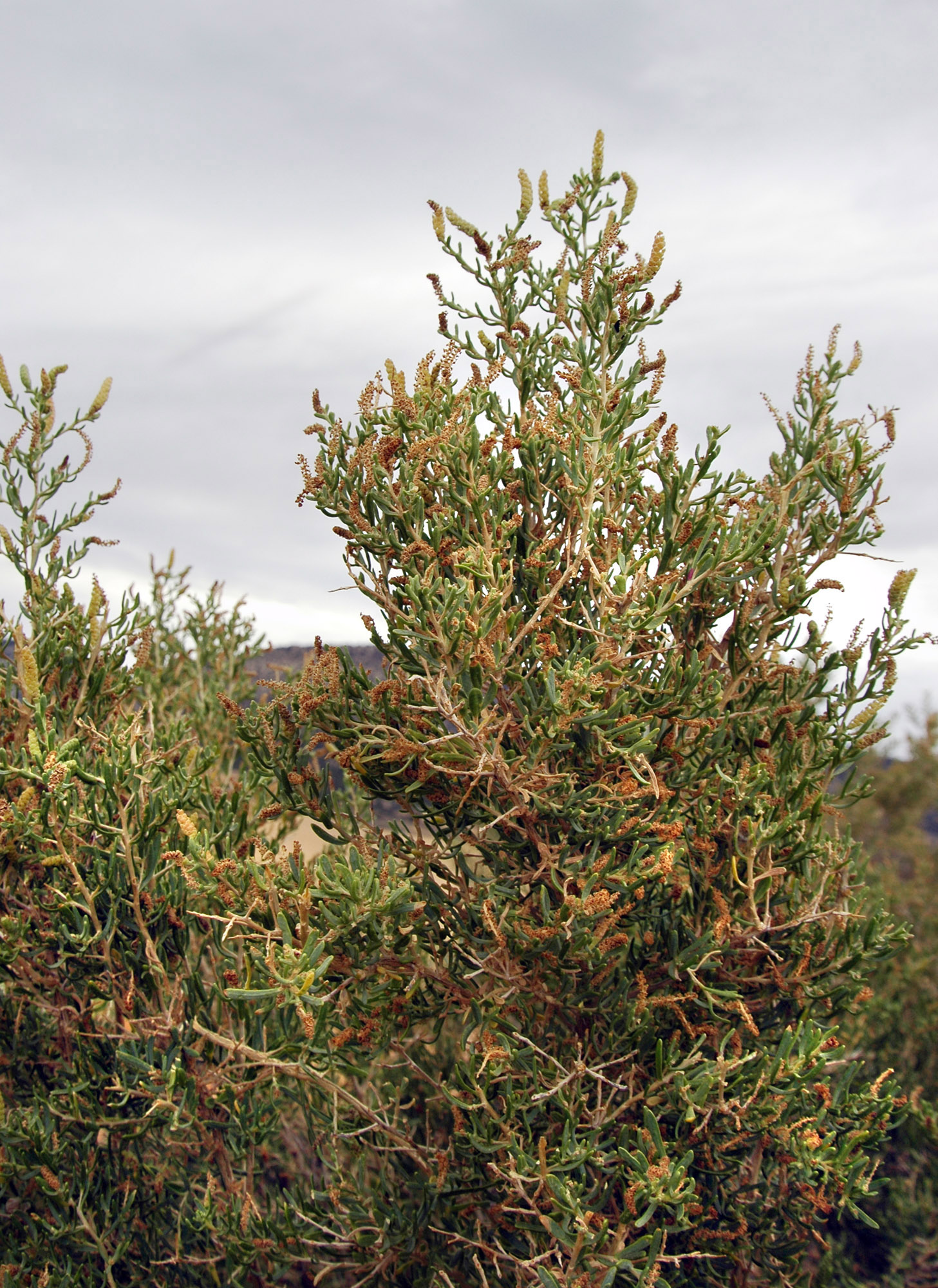
Close-up of greasewood, S. vermiculatus

The Sarcobatus plants are deciduous shrubs growing to 0.5–3 metres tall with spiny branches and green succulent leaves, 10–40 mm long and 1–2 mm broad. The leaves are green, in contrast to the grey-green color of most of the other shrubs within its range. The flowers are unisexual, with the male and female flowers on the same plant and appear from June to August. The species reproduces from seeds and sprouts. S. vermiculatus was described from specimens collected in 1806 by the Lewis and Clark Expedition's westward exploration of North America.

== Habitat ==
The Sarcobatus area of distribution is western North America, from southeastern British Columbia and southwest Alberta, Canada south through the drier regions of the United States (east to North Dakota and west Texas, west to central Washington and eastern California) to northern Mexico (Coahuila).

Both Sarcobatus species are halophytes, usually found in sunny, flat areas around the margins of playas and in dry stream beds and arroyos. While it tolerates salty soil (storing absorbed salt in the roots and leaves), in the southwestern part of its range it is replaced by iodine bush in extremely saline environments, such as hummocks within the playa itself. Greasewood often grows in alkaline flats (being a reliable indicator of alkaline soil) and in extensive, nearly pure stands in pluvial desert locations, being most common on fine-grained soils in areas with a relatively high water table.

== Uses ==
Although it can be grazed by animals that are adapted, grazing of greasewood by sheep and cattle can result in oxalate poisoning resulting in kidney failure. The active agent can be either sodium oxalate or potassium oxalate. Sheep are the most vulnerable.

The wood is yellow, very hard and tough. Because it is so hard, it was used as a shaft for arrows. It was also used as firewood by Native Americans and early settlers. They are used traditionally by Navajo as stirring sticks, Ádístsíín.

== Taxonomy ==
These plants were formerly treated in the family Chenopodiaceae. The family name Sarcobataceae was published in 1997, and is not recognized by the Flora of North America, which however lists it as a "discordant lineage" within the larger group of Chenopodiaceae and Amaranthaceae. The Angiosperm Phylogeny Group (including the APG III system of 2009), does recognize this family. The family comprises the single genus, Sarcobatus, and is placed in the order Caryophyllales in the clade core eudicots. It was suggested that the plastids and the wood anatomy may show an affinity to Phytolaccaceae and Nyctaginaceae rather than to Chenopodiaceae/Amaranthaceae. The sister taxon of Sarcobatus might be Agdestis.

== Species ==
The two species are:

- Sarcobatus baileyi Coville is a Nevada endemic. It is a low shrub to 1 m tall. Leaves hairy, 10–16 mm long. Sometimes considered to be a variety of S. vermiculatus, S. vermiculatus var. baileyi (Coville) Jepson. See the Flora of North America for further discussion (which retains the two species as distinct).
- Sarcobatus vermiculatus (Hook.) Torr. Throughout the range of the genus. Plants are generally 1–2 metres high, although some up to 5 metres high have been recorded. Leaves hairless or only slightly hairy, 15–40 mm long. Synonyms include:
  - Batis vermiculata Hooker
  - Fremontia vermiculata (Hooker) Torrey
  - Sarcobatus maximilianii Nees
