= Amentoflavone =

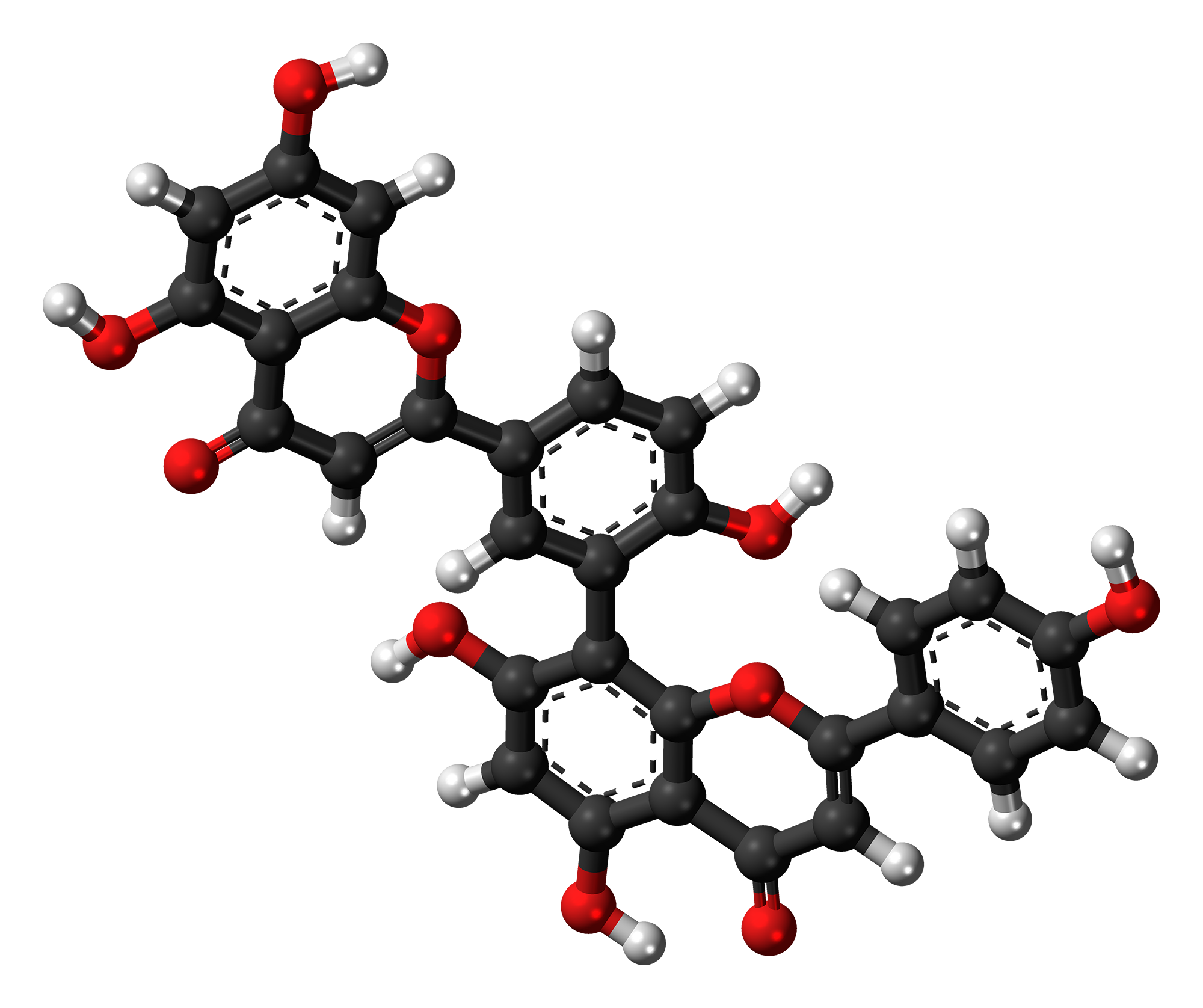

Names
- IUPAC name (4′,5,7-Trihydroxyflavone)-(3′→8)-(4′,5,7-trihydroxyflavone)
- Systematic IUPAC name 8-[5-(5,7-Dihydroxy-4-oxo-4H-1-benzopyran-2-yl)-2-hydroxyphenyl]-5,7-dihydroxy-2-(4-hydroxyphenyl)-4H-1-benzopyran-4-one
- Other names Didemethyl-ginkgetin; 3′,8″-Biapigenin

Identifiers
CAS Number	1617-53-4
3D model (JSmol)	Interactive image
ChEMBL	ChEMBL63354
ChemSpider	4444919
KEGG	C10018
PubChem CID	5281600
UNII	9I1VC79L77
CompTox Dashboard (EPA)	DTXSID20167225
- InChI: InChI=1S/C30H18O10/c31-15-4-1-13(2-5-15)24-12-23(38)29-21(36)10-20(35)27(30(29)40-24)17-7-14(3-6-18(17)33)25-11-22(37)28-19(34)8-16(32)9-26(28)39-25/h1-12,31-36H Key: YUSWMAULDXZHPY-UHFFFAOYSA-N; InChI=1/C30H18O10/c31-15-4-1-13(2-5-15)24-12-23(38)29-21(36)10-20(35)27(30(29)40-24)17-7-14(3-6-18(17)33)25-11-22(37)28-19(34)8-16(32)9-26(28)39-25/h1-12,31-36H Key: YUSWMAULDXZHPY-UHFFFAOYAB
- SMILES: O=C1\C=C(/Oc2cc(O)cc(O)c12)c6cc(c5c(O)cc(O)c3c5O/C(=C\C3=O)c4ccc(O)cc4)c(O)cc6

Properties
Chemical formula	C_{30}H_{18}O_{10}
Molar mass	538.464 g·mol^{−1}
- Except where otherwise noted, data are given for materials in their standard state (at 25 °C [77 °F], 100 kPa). verify (what is ?) Infobox references

Amentoflavone is a biflavonoid (bis-apigenin coupled at 8 and 3′ positions, or 3′,8″-biapigenin) constituent of a number of plants including Ginkgo biloba, Chamaecyparis obtusa (hinoki), Biophytum sensitivum, Selaginella tamariscina, Hypericum perforatum (St. John's Wort) and Xerophyta plicata.

Amentoflavone can interact with many medications by being a potent inhibitor of CYP3A4 and CYP2C9, which are enzymes responsible for the metabolism of some drugs in the body. It is also an inhibitor of human cathepsin B.

Amentoflavone has a variety of in vitro activities including antimalarial activity, anticancer activity (which may, at least in part, be mediated by its inhibition of fatty acid synthase), and antagonist activity at the κ-opioid receptor (K_{e} = 490 nmol L^{−1}) as well as activity at the allosteric benzodiazepine site of the GABA_{A} receptor as a negative allosteric modulator.

== See also ==
- Apigenin
