= Biophytum heinrichsae =

Conservation status
- Vulnerable (IUCN 3.1)

Scientific classification
- Kingdom: Plantae
- Clade: Tracheophytes
- Clade: Angiosperms
- Clade: Eudicots
- Clade: Rosids
- Order: Oxalidales
- Family: Oxalidaceae
- Genus: Biophytum
- Species: B. heinrichsae

Binomial name
- Biophytum heinrichsae R.Knuth

Species of flowering plant

Biophytum heinrichsae is a species of plant in the family Oxalidaceae. It is endemic to Ecuador.
