= Biophytum insigne =

Scientific classification
- Kingdom: Plantae
- Clade: Tracheophytes
- Clade: Angiosperms
- Clade: Eudicots
- Clade: Rosids
- Order: Oxalidales
- Family: Oxalidaceae
- Genus: Biophytum
- Species: B. insigne

Binomial name
- Biophytum insigne Gamble

Species of flowering plant

Biophytum insigne is a plant species in the family Oxalidaceae.

== Description ==
Erect woody perennial shrub with a short, stout stem, usually branched at the base and about 4–8 cm long. Leaves are paripinnate, appearing tufted towards the tips of the branches; rachis 8–16 cm long, pulvinate, and mucronate beyond the terminal pair of leaflets, tomentose. Leaflets 5–8 pairs, measuring 1–2.5 cm × 6–7.5 mm; the lowest pair arises about one-third above the base of the rachis, opposite, subsessile, ovate-oblong with an oblique base and mucronate apex. The terminal pair has the acroscopic half cuneate at the base and the basiscopic half rounded. Young leaflets are tomentose, becoming glabrous at maturity except along the dorsal veins. Stipules are setaceous, about 5 mm long, and hairy.
