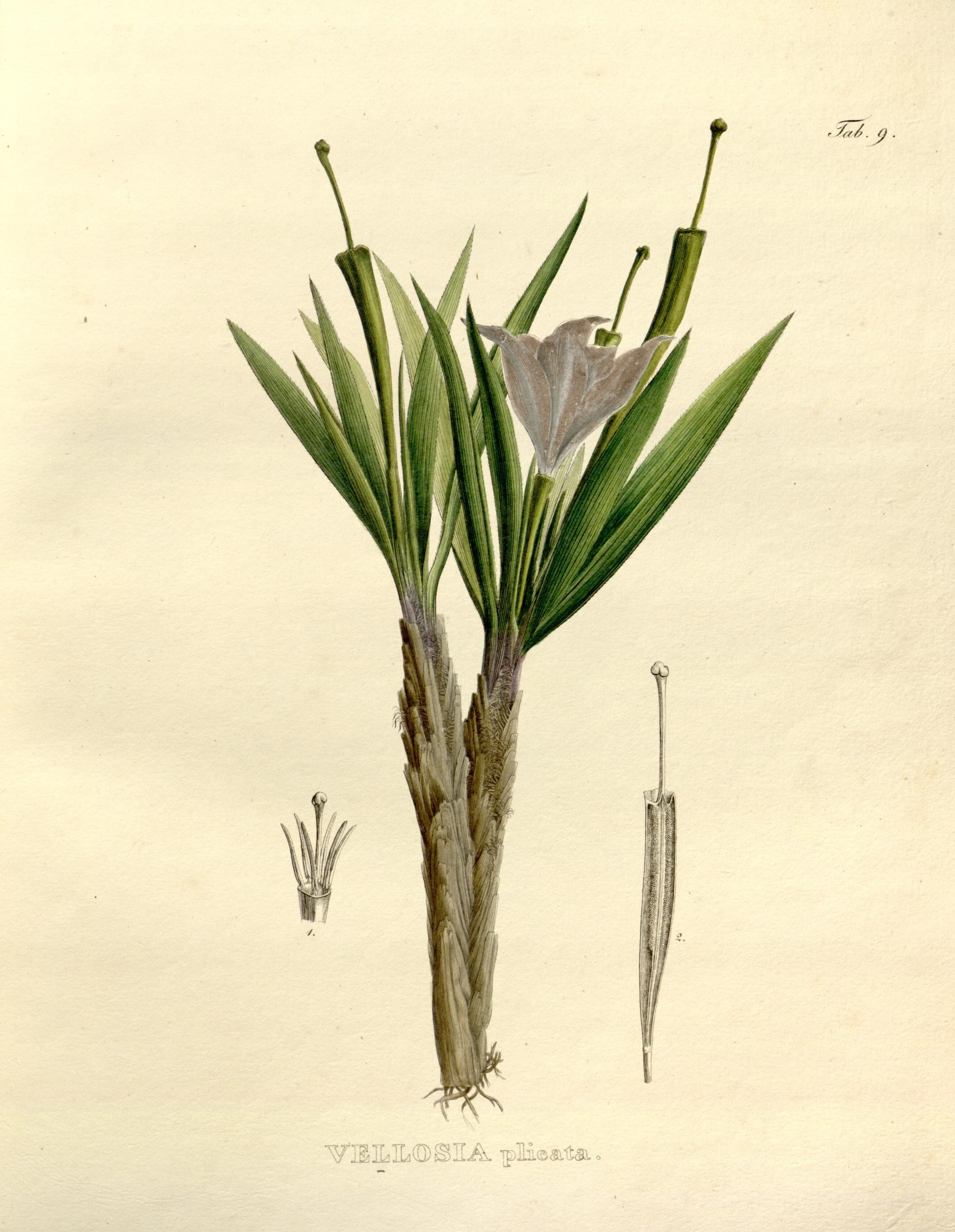
- Nanuza plicata

Scientific classification
- Kingdom: Plantae
- Clade: Tracheophytes
- Clade: Angiosperms
- Clade: Monocots
- Order: Pandanales
- Family: Velloziaceae
- Genus: Nanuza
- Species: N. plicata

Binomial name
- Nanuza plicata (Mart.) L.B. Sm. & Ayensu

Synonyms
- Vellozia plicata Mart.; Xerophyta plicata (Mart.) Spreng.; Vellozia triquetra Pohl; Xerophyta triquetra (Pohl) Baker

= Nanuza plicata =

Species of flowering plant

Nanuza plicata is a plant species in the family Velloziaceae, endemic to Brazil.

Nanuza plicata contains amentoflavone and xerophytolic acid.
