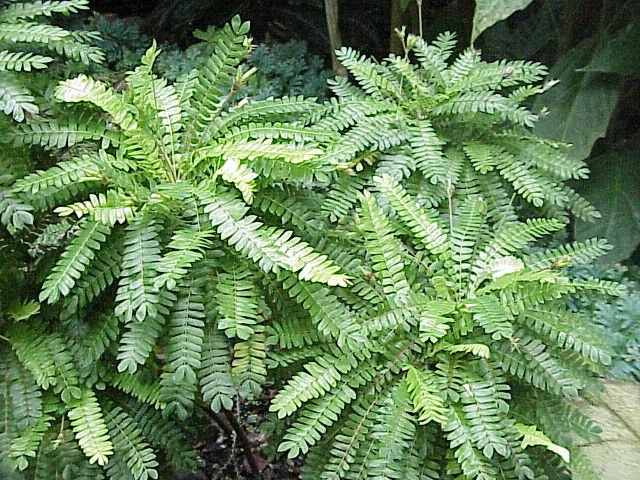
- Biophytum sensitivum

Scientific classification
- Kingdom: Plantae
- Clade: Tracheophytes
- Clade: Angiosperms
- Clade: Eudicots
- Clade: Rosids
- Order: Oxalidales
- Family: Oxalidaceae
- Genus: Biophytum; DC.

= Biophytum =

Genus of flowering plants

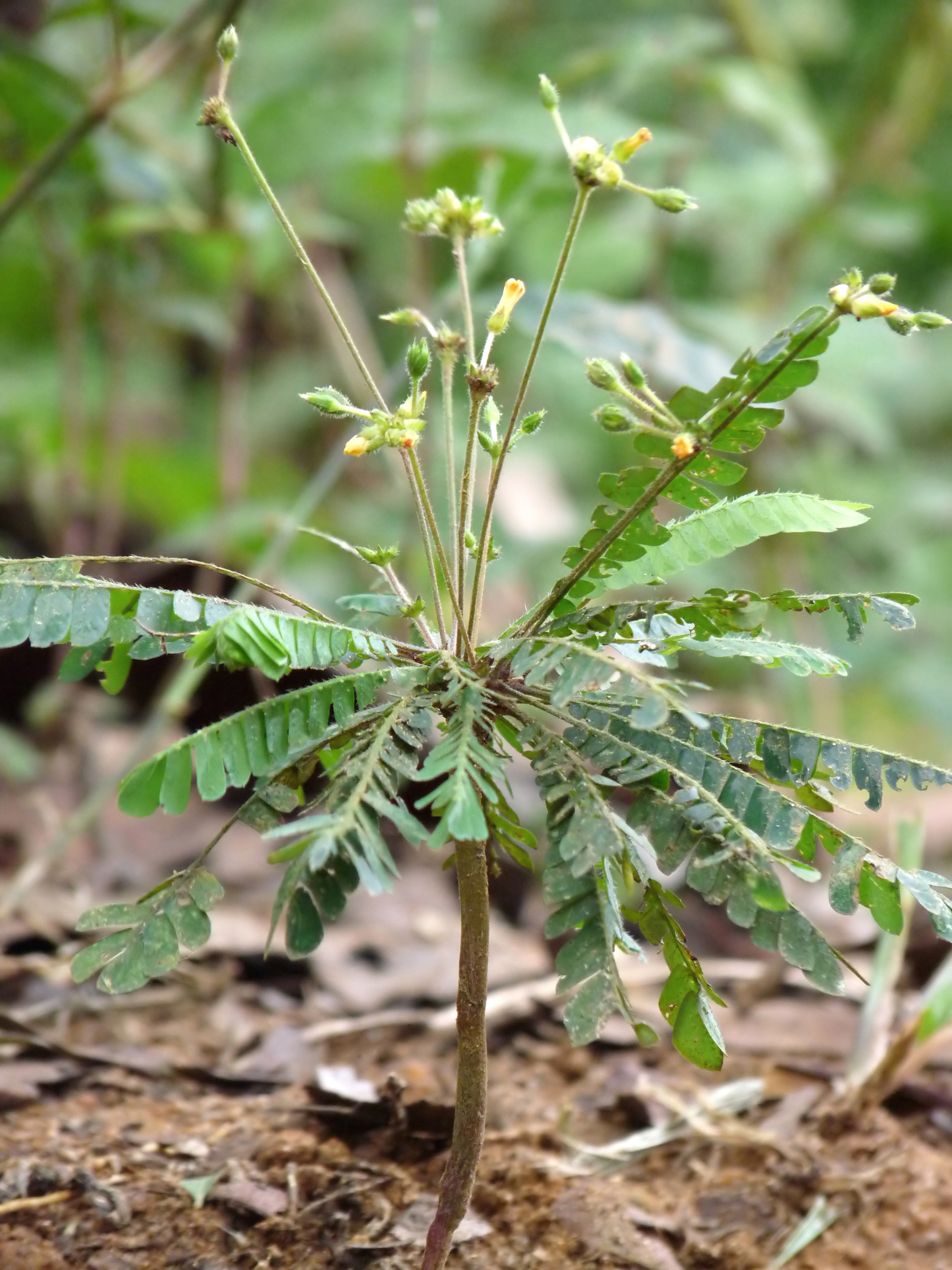
B. reinwardtii in Kerala, India

Biophytum is a genus of about 50 species of annual and perennial herbaceous plants in the family Oxalidaceae. It is found in tropical and subtropical areas worldwide. The annual Biophytum sensitivum is a traditional medicine in Nepal. Biophytum petersianum (also known as Biophytum umbraculum) is a medicinal plant in Mali.

Species include:

- Biophytum abyssinicum – Steud ex A.Rich.
- Biophytum adiantoides – Wight ex Edgew. & Hook.f.
- Biophytum aeschynomenifolia – Guillaumin
- Biophytum albiflorum – F.Muell.
- Biophytum albizzioides – Guillaumin
- Biophytum amazonicum – R.Knuth
- Biophytum antioquiense – Knuth
- Biophytum apodiscias – Edgew. & Hook.f.
- Biophytum bequaertii – De Wild.
- Biophytum bogoroense – De Wild.
- Biophytum bolivianum – R.Knuth
- Biophytum boussingaultii – Klotzsch ex R.Knuth
- Biophytum calophyllum – Guillaumin
- Biophytum candolleanum – Wight
- Biophytum cardonaei – Pittier
- Biophytum casiquiarense – Knuth
- Biophytum castum – R.Knuth
- Biophytum chocoense – Knuth
- Biophytum columbianum – Knuth
- Biophytum commersonii – Guillaumin
- Biophytum congestiflorum – Govind.
- Biophytum cowanii – T.Wendt
- Biophytum crassipes – Engl.
- Biophytum cumingianum – Edgew. & Hook.f.
- Biophytum cumingii – Klotzsch
- Biophytum dendroides – DC.
- Biophytum dormiens – Knuth
- Biophytum dusenii – Engl. ex R.Knuth
- Biophytum esquirolii – H.Lév.
- Biophytum falcifolium – Lourteig
- Biophytum ferrugineum – Rusby
- Biophytum forsythii – R.Knuth
- Biophytum foxii – Sprague
- Biophytum fruticosum – Blume
  - Biophytum fruticosum var. papuanum – Veldkamp
- Biophytum globuliflorum – R.Knuth
- Biophytum gracile – R.Knuth
- Biophytum heinrichsae – R.Knuth
- Biophytum helenae – Buscal. & Muschl.
- Biophytum hermanni – Veldkamp
- Biophytum hildebrandtii – Guillaumin
- Biophytum homblei – De Wild.
- Biophytum huilense – Killip & Cuatrec.
- Biophytum incrassatum – Delhaye
- Biophytum insigne – Gamble
- Biophytum intermedium – Wight
- Biophytum jessenii – Knuth
- Biophytum juninense – R.Knuth
- Biophytum kaessneri – R.Knuth
- Biophytum kamerunense – Engl. & R.Knuth ex Engl.
- Biophytum kayae – Aymard & P.E.Berry
- Biophytum lindsaeifolium – Knuth
- Biophytum longibracteatum – Tadulingam & Cheriyan Jacob
- Biophytum longipedunculatum – Govind.
- Biophytum lourteigiae – Aymard & P.E.Berry
- Biophytum luetzelburgii – Suess.
- Biophytum macrorrhizum – R.E.Fr.
- Biophytum madurense – R.Knuth
- Biophytum mapirense – R.Knuth
- Biophytum microphyllum – Veldkamp
- Biophytum mimosoides – (A.St.-Hil.) Guillaumin
- Biophytum molle – Guillaumin
- Biophytum mucronatum – Lourteig
- Biophytum mutisii – R.Knuth
- Biophytum myriophyllum – R.Knuth
- Biophytum nervifolium – Thwaites
- Biophytum nudum – Edgew. & Hook.f.
- Biophytum nyikense – Exell
- Biophytum ottohuberi – Aymard & P.E.Berry
- Biophytum panamense – Lourteig
- Biophytum passargei – Knuth
- Biophytum pedicellatum – Delhaye
- Biophytum permultijugum – Suess.
- Biophytum perrieri – Guillaumin
- Biophytum peruvianum – R.Knuth
- Biophytum petersianum – Klotzsch
- Biophytum polyphyllum – Munro
- Biophytum poterioides – Edgew. ex Hook.f.
- Biophytum proliferum – Edgew. & Hook.f.
- Biophytum renifolium – Delhaye.
- Biophytum reinwardtii- kerala india
- Biophytum richardsae – Exell
- Biophytum ringoetii – De Wild.
- Biophytum rotundifolium – Delhaye
- Biophytum santanderense – R.Knuth
- Biophytum sensitivum – (L.) DC.
- Biophytum sesbanioides – Edgew. ex Hook.f.
- Biophytum sessile – Wall.
- Biophytum somnians – G.Don
- Biophytum soukupii – Lourteig
- Biophytum talbotii – R.Knuth
- Biophytum tessmannii – R.Knuth
- Biophytum thorelianum – Guillaumin
- Biophytum turianiense – Kabuye
- Biophytum umbraculum – Welw.
- Biophytum uzungwaensis – Frim.-Moll.
- Biophytum veldkampii – A.E.S.Khan, E.S.S.Kumar, S.Binu & Pushp.
- Biophytum verticillatum – Wight
- Biophytum zenkeri – Guillaumin
- Biophytum zunigae – C.Nelson
