= Benke =

The name Benke (meaning "Little Ben") originates from a form of Benedek (Hungarian form of Benedict).

== People ==
- David Benke (born 1946), American Lutheran pastor
- Judit Benke de Laborfalva, known as: Róza Laborfalvi (1817–1886), Hungarian actress
- Mike Benke
- Valéria Benke (1920–2009), Hungarian politician

== See also ==
- Behnke
- Behncke
- Benkei
