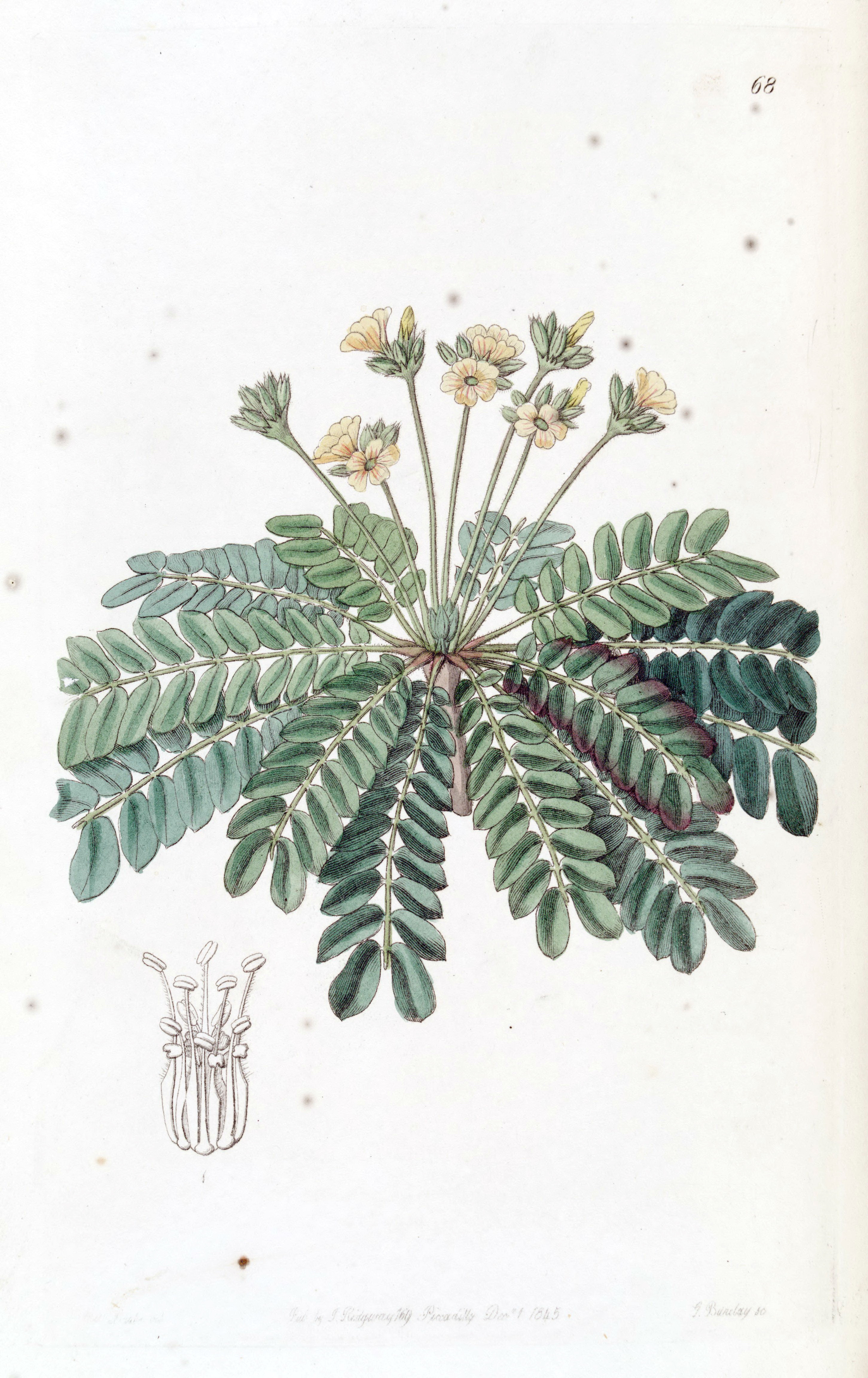

Scientific classification
- Kingdom: Plantae
- Clade: Tracheophytes
- Clade: Angiosperms
- Clade: Eudicots
- Clade: Rosids
- Order: Oxalidales
- Family: Oxalidaceae
- Genus: Biophytum
- Species: B. umbraculum

Binomial name
- Biophytum umbraculum Welw.

= Biophytum umbraculum =

Species of flowering plant

Biophytum umbraculum (the South Pacific palm) is a plant species in the family Oxalidaceae. It is reported from India, China, Indonesia, Malaysia, Burma (Myanmar), New Guinea, Philippines, Thailand, Vietnam, tropical Africa, and Madagascar. The species is an annual herb up to 15 cm tall, bearing sessile umbels.

Biophytum umbraculum Welw., Apont. 55: 590. 1859.
