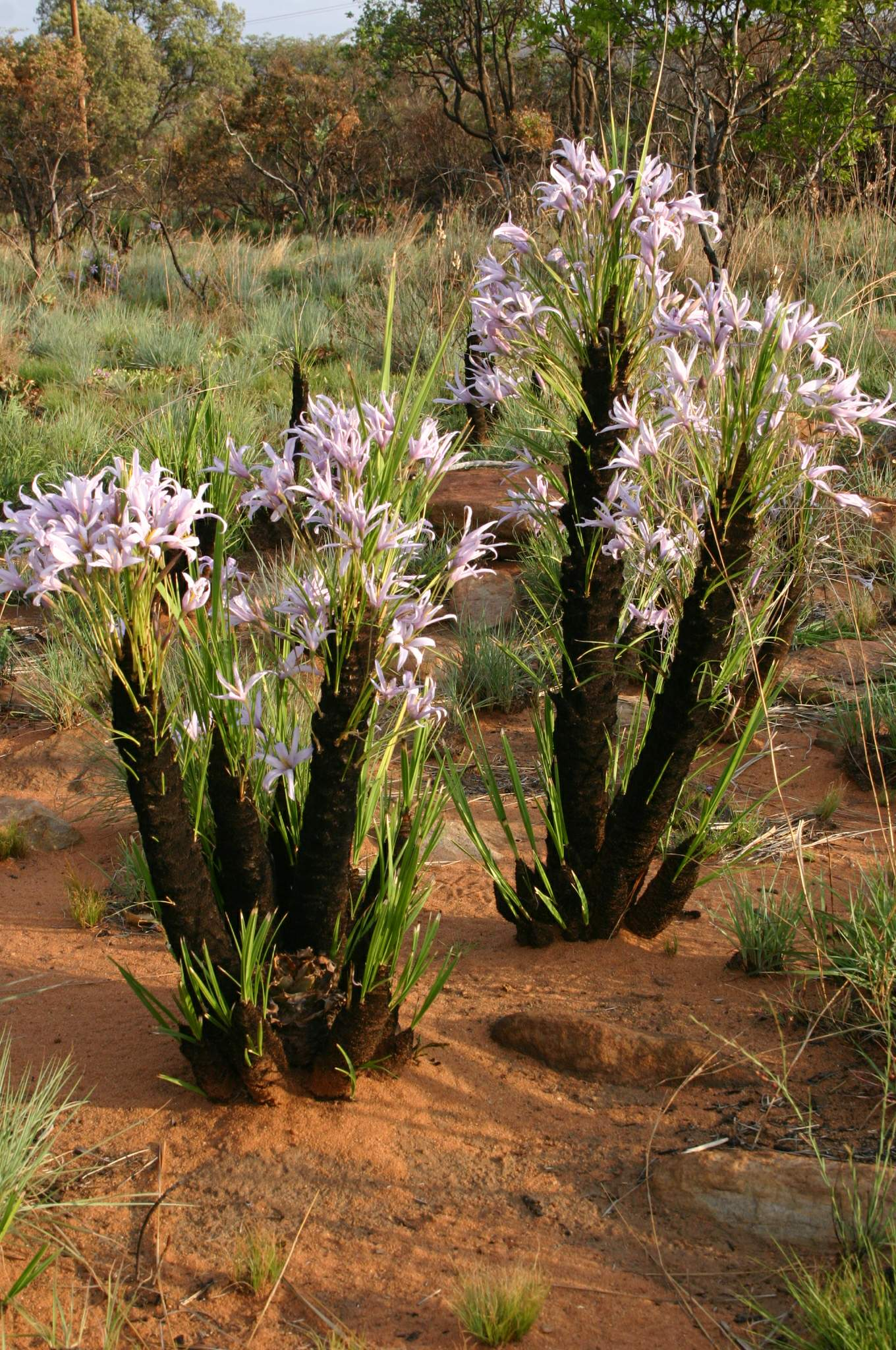

Scientific classification
- Kingdom: Plantae
- Clade: Tracheophytes
- Clade: Angiosperms
- Clade: Monocots
- Order: Pandanales
- Family: Velloziaceae
- Genus: Xerophyta
- Species: X. retinervis

Binomial name
- Xerophyta retinervis Baker, 1875

= Xerophyta retinervis =

Species of flowering plant

Xerophyta retinervis is a deciduous perennial up to 2 metres tall with stout, erect stems, densely covered in persistent, fibrous leaf bases, often charred and blackened by veldfires. Fragrant flowers appear after fire or rain, and are blue or mauve, or rarely white. The small capsules are covered in rough hairs and are loculicidally dehiscent, releasing numerous small, black angled seeds about 2 mm long. The species is tolerant of extreme conditions such as drought, fire, and low temperatures. The old leaf bases are arranged so that rainwater is funnelled down and to the core, where it is absorbed by densely packed roots that run the entire length of the stem. Strap-shaped leaves occur in tufts along stems.

The species is widespread throughout seasonally high rainfall regions, occurring in grasslands on rocky outcrops, and sheetrock with a covering of shallow soil. It may be found through KwaZulu-Natal, Mpumalanga, Gauteng, Limpopo, North West Province, Botswana and Eswatini.

There are some 43 species in this genus, nine occurring in South Africa. The generic name is from the Greek 'xeros' = 'arid', and 'phytos' = 'plant' an allusion to its being drought-tolerant, while the specific name is Latin for 'vein network'. Plants collected by Burke & Zeyher in the Magaliesberg were described by Baker in 1875. Synonyms have included Barbacenia retinervis (Baker) Burtt Davy, Hypoxis vellosioides Harv. ex Baker, Vellozia clavata (Baker) Baker Vellozia retinervis (Baker) Baker and Xerophyta clavata Baker.

== See also ==
- List of Southern African indigenous trees and woody lianes
