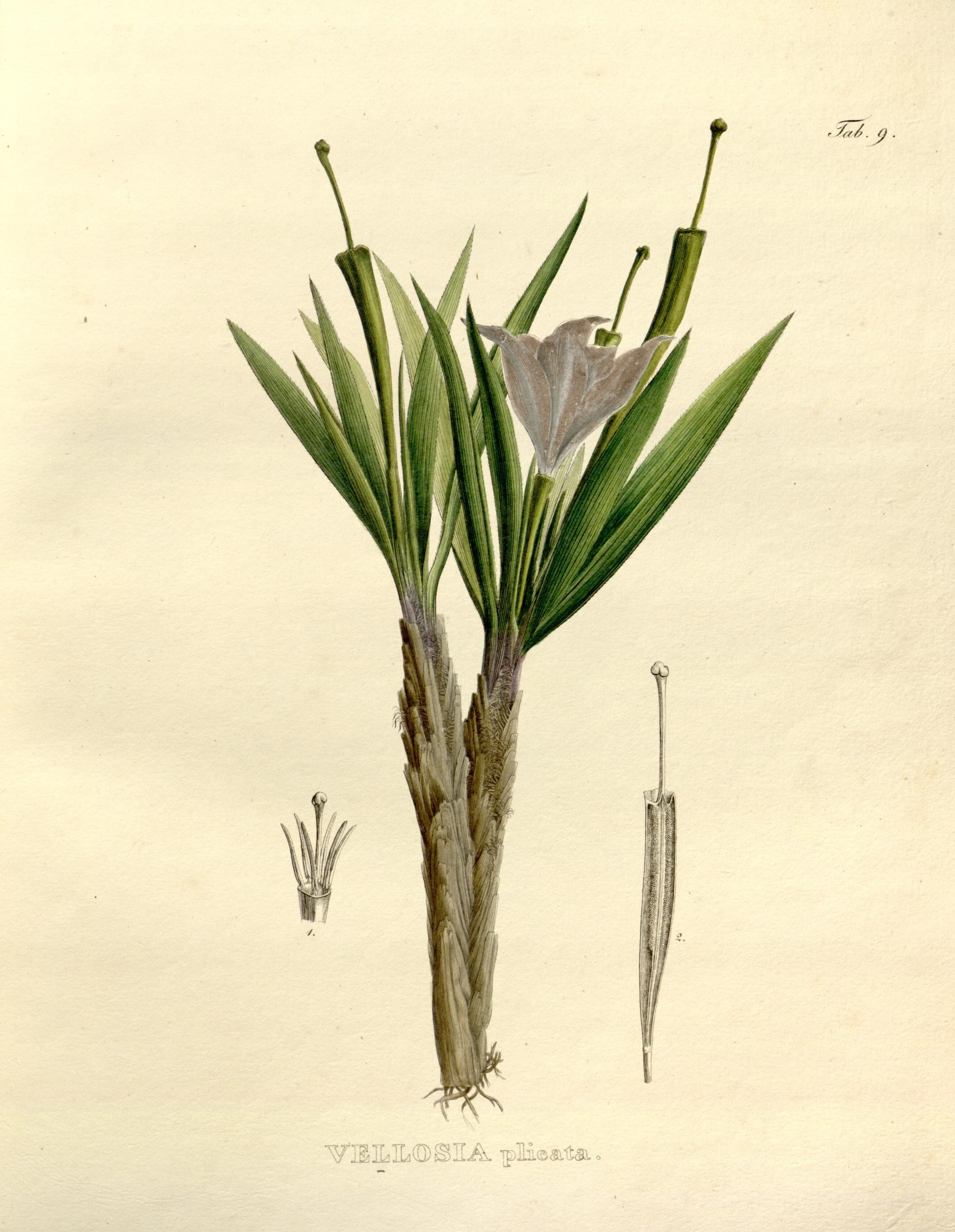
- Nanuza plicata

Scientific classification
- Kingdom: Plantae
- Clade: Tracheophytes
- Clade: Angiosperms
- Clade: Monocots
- Order: Pandanales
- Family: Velloziaceae
- Genus: Nanuza; L.B.Sm. & Ayensu

Type species
- Nanuza plicata (Mart.) L.B.Sm. & Ayensu

= Nanuza =

Genus of flowering plants

Nanuza is a plant genus in the family Velloziaceae, described as a genus in 1976. The entire genus is endemic to Brazil.

Species

- Nanuza almeidae R.J.V.Alves - Bahia, Espírito Santo, Rio de Janeiro
- Nanuza luetzelburgii R.J.V.Alves - Pernambuco, Piauí
- Nanuza plicata (Mart.) L.B.Sm. & Ayensu - Espírito Santo, Bahia, Minas Gerais
