= Barbaceniopsis =

Scientific classification
- Kingdom: Plantae
- Clade: Tracheophytes
- Clade: Angiosperms
- Clade: Monocots
- Order: Pandanales
- Family: Velloziaceae
- Genus: Barbaceniopsis; L.B. Sm.

Type species
- Barbaceniopsis boliviensis (Baker) L.B.Sm.

Genus of flowering plants

Barbaceniopsis is a plant genus in the family Velloziaceae, described as a genus in 1962. It is native to South America (Peru, Bolivia, northern Argentina)

Species

- Barbaceniopsis boliviensis (Baker) L.B.Sm. - Bolivia, northern Argentina
- Barbaceniopsis castillonii (Hauman) Ibisch - Bolivia
- Barbaceniopsis humahuaquensis Noher. - Jujuy Province in northwestern Argentina
- Barbaceniopsis vargasiana (L.B.Sm.) L.B.Sm. - Peru
