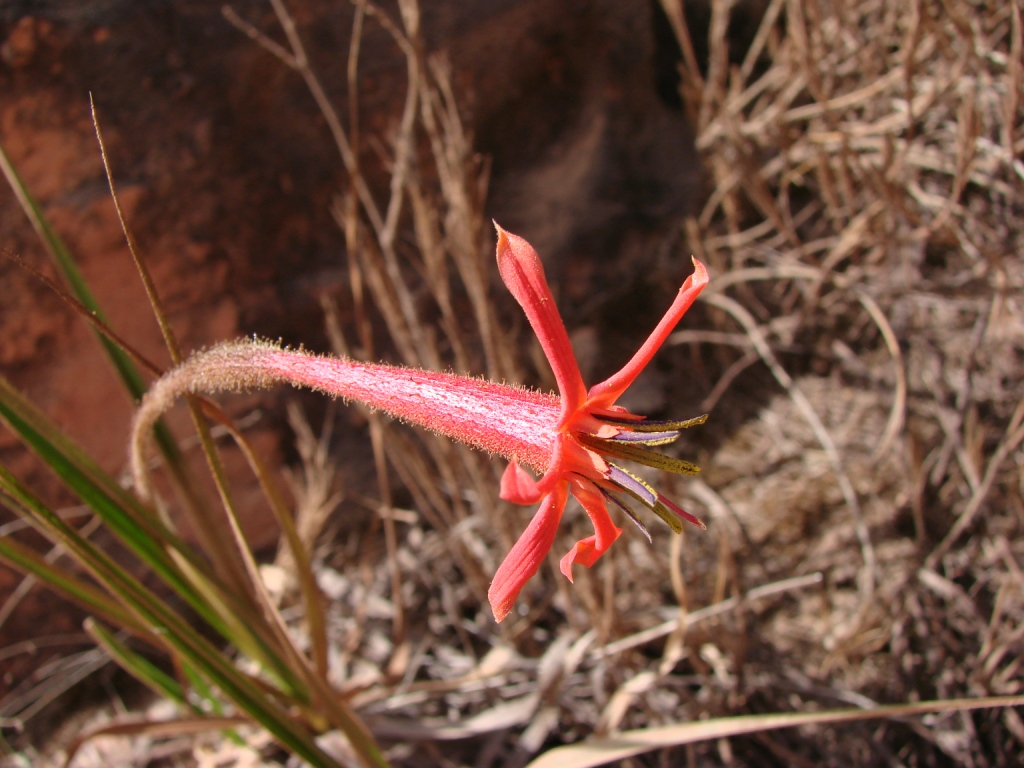
- Barbacenia umbrosa

Scientific classification
- Kingdom: Plantae
- Clade: Tracheophytes
- Clade: Angiosperms
- Clade: Monocots
- Order: Pandanales
- Family: Velloziaceae
- Genus: Barbacenia; Vand.

Synonyms
- Campderia A.Rich., 1822; Pleurostima Raf., 1837; Visnea Steud. ex Endl., 1837; Aylthonia N.L.Menezes, 1971; Burlemarxia N.L.Menezes & Semir, 1991

= Barbacenia =

Genus of flowering plants

Barbacenia is a plant genus in the family Velloziaceae, described as a genus in 1788. The entire genus is endemic to Brazil with the exception of B. celiae, which crosses the border into Venezuela.

Species

- Barbacenia andersonii - Goiás
- Barbacenia aurea - Minas Gerais
- Barbacenia bahiana - Bahia
- Barbacenia beauverdii - Minas Gerais
- Barbacenia bishopii - Brazil
- Barbacenia blackii - Minas Gerais
- Barbacenia blanchetii - Bahia
- Barbacenia brachycalyx - Goiás
- Barbacenia brasiliensis - Minas Gerais
- Barbacenia brevifolia - Brazil
- Barbacenia burle-marxii - Espírito Santo
- Barbacenia caricina - Minas Gerais
- Barbacenia celiae - Roraima, Venezuelan Amazonas
- Barbacenia chlorantha - Minas Gerais
- Barbacenia coccinea - Minas Gerais
- Barbacenia conicostigma - Minas Gerais
- Barbacenia contasana - Brazil
- Barbacenia coronata - Minas Gerais
- Barbacenia culta - Rio de Janeiro
- Barbacenia curviflora - Minas Gerais
- Barbacenia cuspidata - Minas Gerais
- Barbacenia cyananthera - Minas Gerais
- Barbacenia cylindrica - Goiás
- Barbacenia damaziana - Minas Gerais
- Barbacenia delicatula - Minas Gerais
- Barbacenia ensifolia - Minas Gerais
- Barbacenia exscapa - Minas Gerais
- Barbacenia fanniae - Brazil
- Barbacenia filamentifera - Minas Gerais
- Barbacenia flava - Minas Gerais
- Barbacenia flavida - Goiás
- Barbacenia foliosa - Rio de Janeiro
- Barbacenia fragrans - Minas Gerais
- Barbacenia fulva - Minas Gerais
- Barbacenia gardneri - Minas Gerais
- Barbacenia gaveensis - Rio de Janeiro
- Barbacenia gentianoides - Minas Gerais
- Barbacenia glabra - Minas Gerais
- Barbacenia glauca - Minas Gerais
- Barbacenia glaziovii - Minas Gerais
- Barbacenia globata - Minas Gerais
- Barbacenia glutinosa - Minas Gerais
- Barbacenia goethartii - Minas Gerais
- Barbacenia gounelleana - Rio de Janeiro
- Barbacenia graciliflora - Minas Gerais
- Barbacenia graminifolia - Minas Gerais
- Barbacenia grisea - Minas Gerais
- Barbacenia hatschbachii - Mato Grosso do Sul
- Barbacenia hilairei - Minas Gerais
- Barbacenia hirtiflora - Minas Gerais
- Barbacenia ignea - Minas Gerais
- Barbacenia inclinata - Minas Gerais
- Barbacenia involucrata - Minas Gerais
- Barbacenia ionantha - Minas Gerais
- Barbacenia irwiniana - Minas Gerais
- Barbacenia itabirensis - Minas Gerais
- Barbacenia latifolia - Minas Gerais
- Barbacenia leucopoda - Minas Gerais
- Barbacenia lilacina - Minas Gerais
- Barbacenia longiflora - Minas Gerais
- Barbacenia longiscapa - Minas Gerais
- Barbacenia luzulifolia - Minas Gerais
- Barbacenia lymansmithii - Minas Gerais
- Barbacenia macrantha - Minas Gerais
- Barbacenia mantiqueirae - São Paulo
- Barbacenia markgrafii - Minas Gerais
- Barbacenia minima - Brazil
- Barbacenia mollis - Minas Gerais
- Barbacenia monticola - Minas Gerais
- Barbacenia nana - Minas Gerais
- Barbacenia nanuzae - Minas Gerais
- Barbacenia nigrimarginata - Goiás
- Barbacenia nuda - Minas Gerais
- Barbacenia oxytepala - Minas Gerais
- Barbacenia pabstiana - Espírito Santo
- Barbacenia pallida - Minas Gerais
- Barbacenia paranaensis - Paraná
- Barbacenia plantaginea - Minas Gerais
- Barbacenia polyantha - Minas Gerais
- Barbacenia pulverulenta - Minas Gerais
- Barbacenia pungens - Brazil
- Barbacenia purpurea - Rio de Janeiro
- Barbacenia rectifolia - Minas Gerais
- Barbacenia reflexa - Minas Gerais
- Barbacenia regis - Brazil
- Barbacenia riedeliana - Minas Gerais
- Barbacenia riparia - Minas Gerais
- Barbacenia rodriguesii - Minas Gerais
- Barbacenia × rogieri - Brazil
- Barbacenia rubra - Minas Gerais
- Barbacenia rubrovirens - Minas Gerais
- Barbacenia salmonea - Minas Gerais
- Barbacenia saxicola - Minas Gerais
- Barbacenia schidigera - Minas Gerais
- Barbacenia schwackei - Minas Gerais
- Barbacenia sellovii - Minas Gerais
- Barbacenia sessiliflora - Minas Gerais
- Barbacenia seubertiana - Rio de Janeiro
- Barbacenia spectabilis - Espírito Santo
- Barbacenia spiralis - Minas Gerais
- Barbacenia squamata - Rio de Janeiro
- Barbacenia stenophylla - Minas Gerais, Goiás
- Barbacenia tomentosa - Minas Gerais
- Barbacenia tricolor - Minas Gerais
- Barbacenia trigona - Minas Gerais
- Barbacenia umbrosa - Minas Gerais
- Barbacenia vandellii - Minas Gerais
- Barbacenia viscosissima - Minas Gerais
- Barbacenia williamsii - Minas Gerais
