= Dysphania =

Dysphania may refer to:

- Dysphania (moth), a Lepidoptera animal genus
- Dysphania (plant), an Amaranthaceae plant genus
