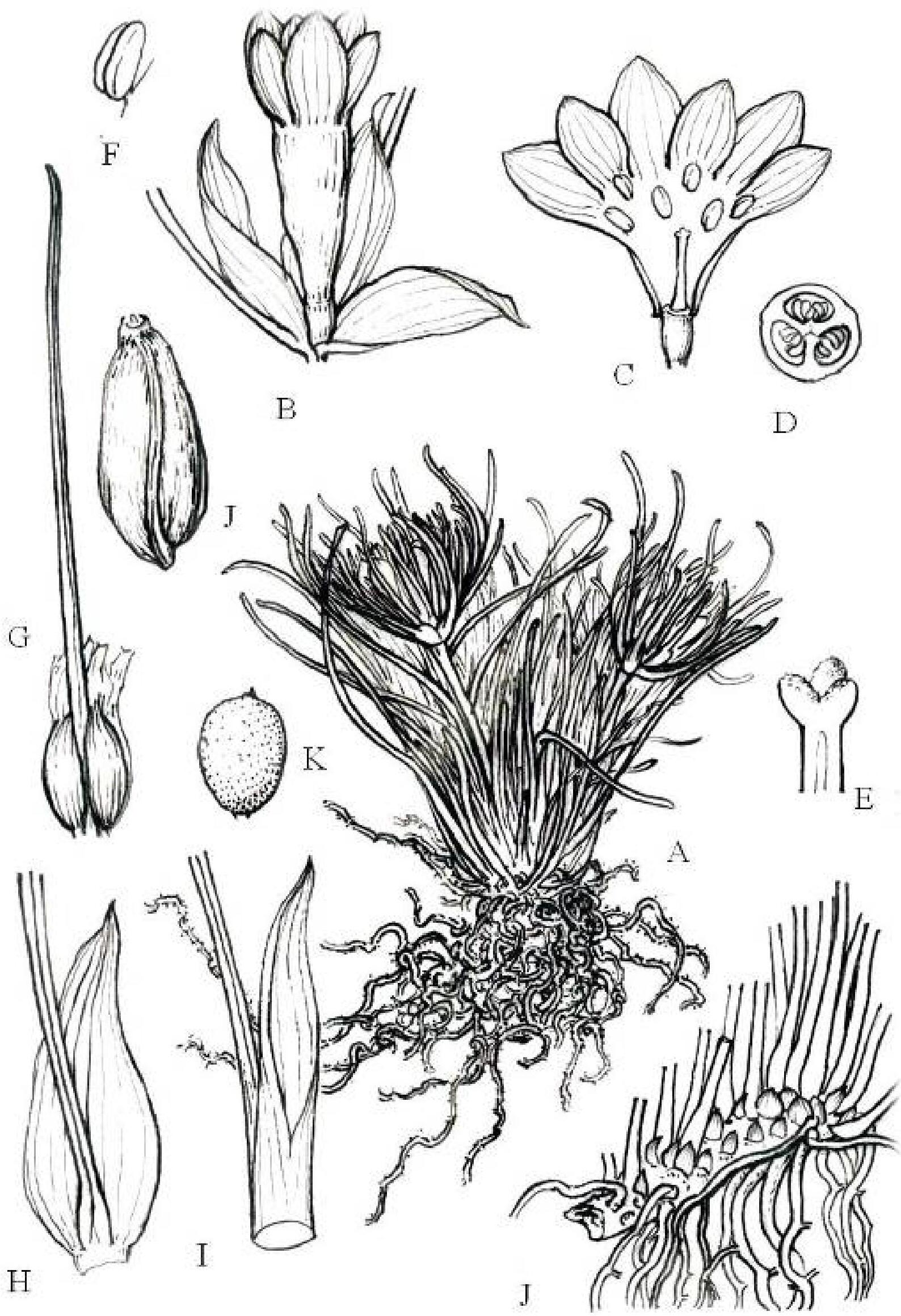

Conservation status
- Vulnerable (IUCN 3.1)

Scientific classification
- Kingdom: Plantae
- Clade: Tracheophytes
- Clade: Angiosperms
- Clade: Monocots
- Order: Pandanales
- Family: Velloziaceae
- Genus: Acanthochlamys; P.C. Kao
- Species: A. bracteata

Binomial name
- Acanthochlamys bracteata P.C.Kao

Synonyms
- Didymocolpus S.C. Chen; Didymocolpus nanus S.C. Chen

= Acanthochlamys =

Genus of flowering plants

Acanthochlamys is a monotypic genus of herbaceous plants described as a genus in 1980. It has long been included in the Amaryllidaceae, but more recent systems place it in the Velloziaceae. Kao in 1989 placed in its own family, the Acanthochlamydaceae.

There is only one known species, Acanthochlamys bracteata, native to Tibet and Sichuan.
