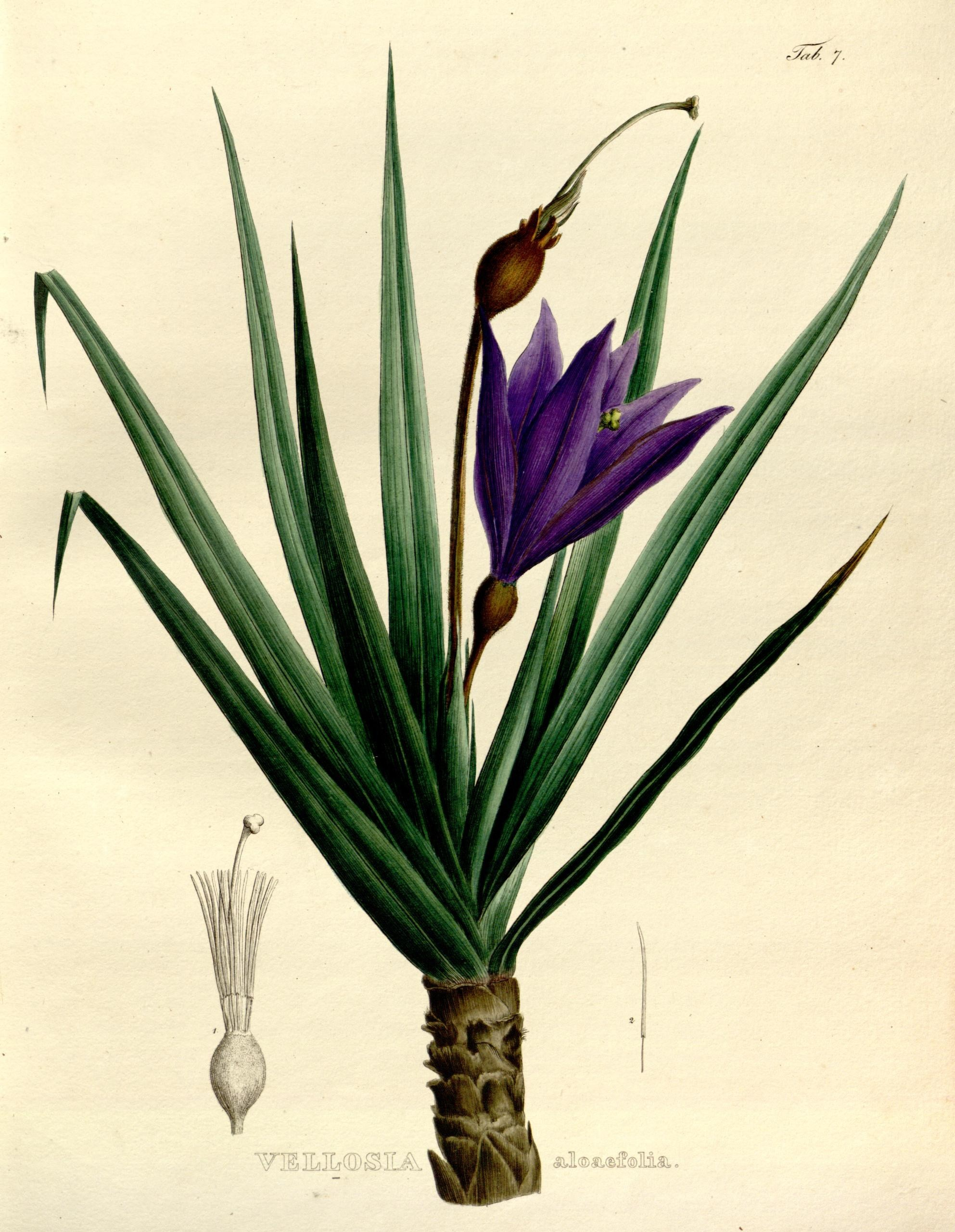
- Vellozia aloifolia

Scientific classification
- Kingdom: Plantae
- Clade: Tracheophytes
- Clade: Angiosperms
- Clade: Monocots
- Order: Pandanales
- Family: Velloziaceae
- Genus: Vellozia; Vand.

Type species
- Vellozia candida J.C. Mikan

= Vellozia =

Genus of flowering plants

Vellozia is a plant genus in the family Velloziaceae, established in 1788.

The genus is endemic to South America except for one species (V. tubiflora), whose range extends into Panama. Most of the species are native to Brazil, with a dense concentration of species in the State of Minas Gerais.

Species

- Vellozia abietina - Minas Gerais
- Vellozia alata - Minas Gerais
- Vellozia albiflora - Minas Gerais
- Vellozia aloifolia - Minas Gerais
- Vellozia alutacea - Goiás, Minas Gerais, São Paulo
- Vellozia andina - Bolivia
- Vellozia angustifolia - Goiás, Minas Gerais
- Vellozia arenicola - Minas Gerais
- Vellozia armata - Minas Gerais
- Vellozia asperula - Minas Gerais
- Vellozia auriculata - Minas Gerais
- Vellozia bahiana - Bahia, Minas Gerais, São Paulo
- Vellozia barbaceniifolia - Brazil
- Vellozia barbata - Minas Gerais
- Vellozia bicarinata - Minas Gerais
- Vellozia blanchetiana - Minas Gerais, Bahia
- Vellozia brachypoda - Minas Gerais
- Vellozia bradei - Minas Gerais
- Vellozia brevifolia - Minas Gerais
- Vellozia breviscapa - Minas Gerais
- Vellozia bulbosa - Pará
- Vellozia burle-marxii - Bahia
- Vellozia caespitosa - Minas Gerais
- Vellozia campanuloides - Bahia
- Vellozia candida - Rio de Janeiro
- Vellozia canelinha - Bahia
- Vellozia capiticola - Bahia
- Vellozia caput-ardeae - Minas Gerais
- Vellozia caruncularis - Goiás, Minas Gerais, Santa Cruz
- Vellozia castanea - Minas Gerais
- Vellozia caudata - Bahia
- Vellozia ciliata - Minas Gerais
- Vellozia cinerascens - Pernambuco, Bahia, Piauí, Minas Gerais
- Vellozia compacta - Minas Gerais
- Vellozia coronata - Minas Gerais
- Vellozia costata - Minas Gerais
- Vellozia crinita - Minas Gerais
- Vellozia crispata - Minas Gerais
- Vellozia cryptantha - Minas Gerais
- Vellozia dasypus - Sergipe, Bahia
- Vellozia decidua - Minas Gerais
- Vellozia declinans - Minas Gerais
- Vellozia echinata - Brazil
- Vellozia epidendroides - Minas Gerais
- Vellozia exilis - Goiás
- Vellozia fibrosa - Minas Gerais
- Vellozia fimbriata - Minas Gerais
- Vellozia froesii - Bahia
- Vellozia fruticosa - Minas Gerais
- Vellozia furcata - Bahia
- Vellozia geotegens - Minas Gerais
- Vellozia gigantea - Minas Gerais
- Vellozia glabra - Goiás, Minas Gerais
- Vellozia glandulifera - Minas Gerais
- Vellozia glauca - Goiás
- Vellozia glochidea - Goiás, Minas Gerais, Pará
- Vellozia goiasensis - Goiás
- Vellozia graminea - Minas Gerais
- Vellozia granulata - Minas Gerais
- Vellozia grao-mogulensis - Minas Gerais
- Vellozia grisea - Goiás, Minas Gerais
- Vellozia gurkenii - Goiás
- Vellozia harleyi - Bahia
- Vellozia hatschbachii - Bahia, Minas Gerais
- Vellozia hemisphaerica - Bahia
- Vellozia hirsuta - Bahia, Minas Gerais
- Vellozia hypoxoides - Goiás
- Vellozia incurvata - Minas Gerais
- Vellozia intermedia - Minas Gerais
- Vellozia jolyi - Bahia
- Vellozia kolbekii - Minas Gerais
- Vellozia laevis - Minas Gerais
- Vellozia lilacina - Minas Gerais
- Vellozia luteola - Brazil
- Vellozia macedonis - Minas Gerais
- Vellozia marcescens - Minas Gerais
- Vellozia maxillarioides - Minas Gerais
- Vellozia metzgerae - Minas Gerais
- Vellozia minima - Minas Gerais
- Vellozia modesta - Minas Gerais
- Vellozia nanuzae - Minas Gerais
- Vellozia nivea - Minas Gerais
- Vellozia nuda - Minas Gerais
- Vellozia obtecta - Brazil
- Vellozia ornata - Minas Gerais
- Vellozia patens - Minas Gerais
- Vellozia peripherica - Brazil
- Vellozia pilosa - Minas Gerais
- Vellozia piresiana - Minas Gerais
- Vellozia prolifera - Minas Gerais
- Vellozia pterocarpa - Minas Gerais
- Vellozia pulchra - Minas Gerais
- Vellozia pumila - Goiás, Distrito Federal
- Vellozia punctulata - Bahia
- Vellozia pusilla - Minas Gerais
- Vellozia ramosissima - Minas Gerais
- Vellozia resinosa - Minas Gerais
- Vellozia scabrosa - Minas Gerais
- Vellozia scoparia - Minas Gerais
- Vellozia sellowii - Minas Gerais, Santa Cruz
- Vellozia sessilis - Goiás
- Vellozia seubertiana - Mato Grosso do Sul, Mato Grosso, Goiás, Bahia
- Vellozia sincorana - Bahia, Minas Gerais
- Vellozia spiralis - Minas Gerais
- Vellozia squalida - Minas Gerais
- Vellozia squamata - Brazil
- Vellozia stellata - Bahia
- Vellozia stenocarpa - Minas Gerais
- Vellozia stipitata - Minas Gerais
- Vellozia streptophylla - Minas Gerais
- Vellozia subalata - Minas Gerais
- Vellozia subscabra - Brazil
- Vellozia sulphurea - Minas Gerais
- Vellozia swallenii - Distrito Federal, Goiás, Maranhão
- Vellozia taxifolia - Minas Gerais
- Vellozia teres - Minas Gerais
- Vellozia tillandsioides - Minas Gerais
- Vellozia tomeana - Minas Gerais
- Vellozia tomentosa - Brazil
- Vellozia torquata - Minas Gerais
- Vellozia tragacantha - Bahia, Minas Gerais
- Vellozia tubiflora - Venezuela, Guyana, Brazil, Santa Cruz, Meta, Vaupés, Panama
- Vellozia variegata - Rio de Janeiro, Minas Gerais, Espírito Santo
- Vellozia verruculosa - Goiás
- Vellozia viannae - Minas Gerais
- Vellozia virgata - Minas Gerais
- Vellozia wasshausenii - Minas Gerais
