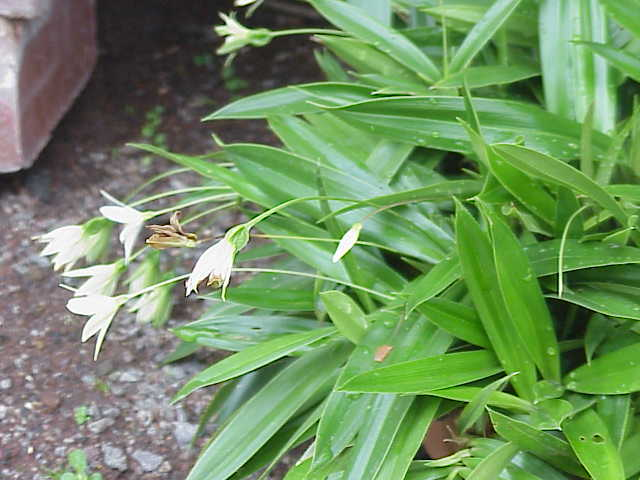

Scientific classification
- Kingdom: Plantae
- Clade: Tracheophytes
- Clade: Angiosperms
- Clade: Monocots
- Order: Pandanales
- Family: Velloziaceae
- Genus: Xerophyta
- Species: X. elegans

Binomial name
- Xerophyta elegans (Balf.) Baker

Synonyms
- Barbacenia elegans (Balf.) Pax; Hypoxis barbacenioides Harv. ex Baker; Talbotia elegans Balf.; Talbotiopsis elegans (Balf.) L.B. Sm.; Vellozia elegans (Balf.) Oliv. ex Hook. f.; Vellozia elegans var. elegans; Vellozia elegans var. minor (Baker) Baker; Vellozia talbotii Balf.; Xerophyta minuta Baker

= Xerophyta elegans =

Species of plant

Xerophyta elegans, previously named Talbotia elegans, is a species of plants in the family Velloziaceae. It is endemic to South Africa and its natural distribution and habitat is restricted to Drakensberg Mountains in Mpumalanga province. The plant is evergreen and similar to other members of its family it is able to express high level or tolerance against desiccation and even long treatment with sulphuric acid. Under wet conditions, its leaves are able to revive and restart its photosynthetic abilities. The plant produces narrow but long, leathery leaves and white star-shaped flowers with yellow stamens. The seeds are hooked thus enhancing dispersal by animals.
