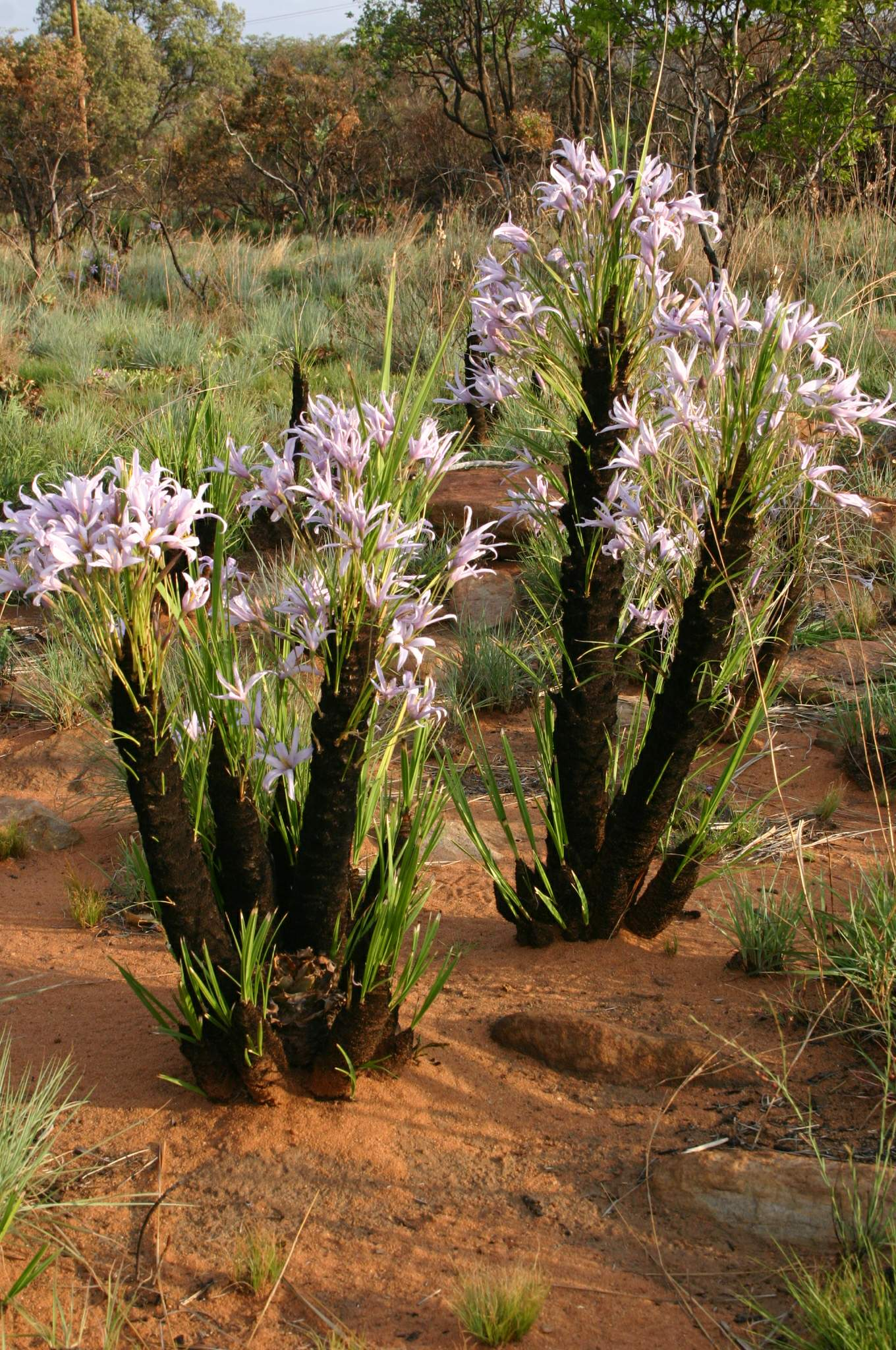
- Xerophyta retinervis

Scientific classification
- Kingdom: Plantae
- Clade: Embryophytes
- Clade: Tracheophytes
- Clade: Spermatophytes
- Clade: Angiosperms
- Clade: Monocots
- Order: Pandanales
- Family: Velloziaceae; J.Agardh

Genera
- Acanthochlamys P.C.Kao; Barbacenia Vand.; Barbaceniopsis L.B.Sm.; Nanuza L.B.Sm. & Ayensu; Vellozia Vand.; Xerophyta Juss.

= Velloziaceae =

Velloziaceae Temporal range: Mid Neogene – Recent 14–0 Ma

Family of flowering plants

Velloziaceae is a family of monocotyledonous flowering plants. The APG II system, of 2003 (unchanged from the APG system, 1998), also recognizes this family, and assigns it to the order Pandanales.

== Relationships and evolution ==
By contrast to other members of Pandanales the family demonstrates stricter flower morphology. Despite that, the flower structure is still quite variable and with a lot of specifics. Thus morphological analyses are not able to uncover realistic phylogenetical relationships neither appropriate taxonomy. Embryological development places the family among the amaryllids while the composition of the ovary puts it near the distinct Hypoxidaceae. However, a study regarding the pollen structure in two genera from Velloziaceae was found to be an important character and suggests some correlation but this is still a variable trait.

Molecular analyses recognize five distinct genera (by including Talbotia in Xerophyta and Nanuza in Vellozia thus forming two sister groups) and show that the monotypic genus Acanthochlamys is sister to the rest of the members. The family originated in Gondwana. The crown group is dated to be very young - 14 Mya (Mid Neogene) but the stem group was found to be much older - 108 Mya (Mid Cretaceous). Velloziaceae has a total of 306 known species.

- Velloziaceae
  - Asian clade
    Acanthochlamys
  - - African clade
      - Talbotia
      - Xerophyta
    - South American clade
      - Barbacenia
      - - Barbaceniopsis
        - - Vellozia
          - Nanuza

== Distribution and ecology ==
Members of Velloziaceae are distributed both in the Old and the New world. Genera as Vellozia, Nanuza and Barbacenia are found in South America (Brazil, Cerrado). Xerophyta and Talbotia are growing across Africa. Plants from the family are also found in Madagascar and the southern part of the Arabian Peninsula. One distinct species (Acanthochlamys bracteata) is restricted to China as the only member found in Asia.

Velloziaceae includes different xerophytes inhabiting open and dry habitats. These plants exhibit various adaptations against desiccation as for example less-densely distributed stomata, decreased surface area by the use of developed furrows (as in many cacti) and expansive leaf sheets that cover the stem or the aerial roots until they grow long enough to reach the ground level. In some members these sheaths are able to create a microclimate that sustains the roots by keeping a constant level of moisture.

== Flowers ==
In the majority of Velloziaceae flowers are single or sometimes collected in bracts. There is no definite flowering period. They are hypanthium-forming, sometimes papillate at their base or smooth, mostly white, creme or colored in different shades of purple although species with yellow, orange or red flowers also exist. Despite stricter, their structure is quite variable in some aspects (the number and structure of stamens varies at very high rate) as in other members of Pandanales. Tepals are six. The ovary is divided into three chambers with many ovules developed in them. Pistil and Stigma are also divided into three parts.

== Pollen and pollination ==
Examination with scanning electron microscope uncovers that one of the distinctive characteristics of the family is the structure of the pollen. Its shape and composition are distinctive. For example, in Barbacenia pollen grains are singular and represent simple monads with ellipsoidal shape and one aperture. In Vellozia the grains are tetragonal (organized in tetrads) and non-apperturate. The size of pollen in Barbacenia is around half the size of that of Vellozia. However, the structure of the exine (pollen's envelopment) is a trait shared by the members of Velloziaceae. It is composed of many reticulations which in many cases may be described as vermiform. In some species, such as Vellozia abietina, the pollen wall does not fit this description, lacking any surface reticulations.

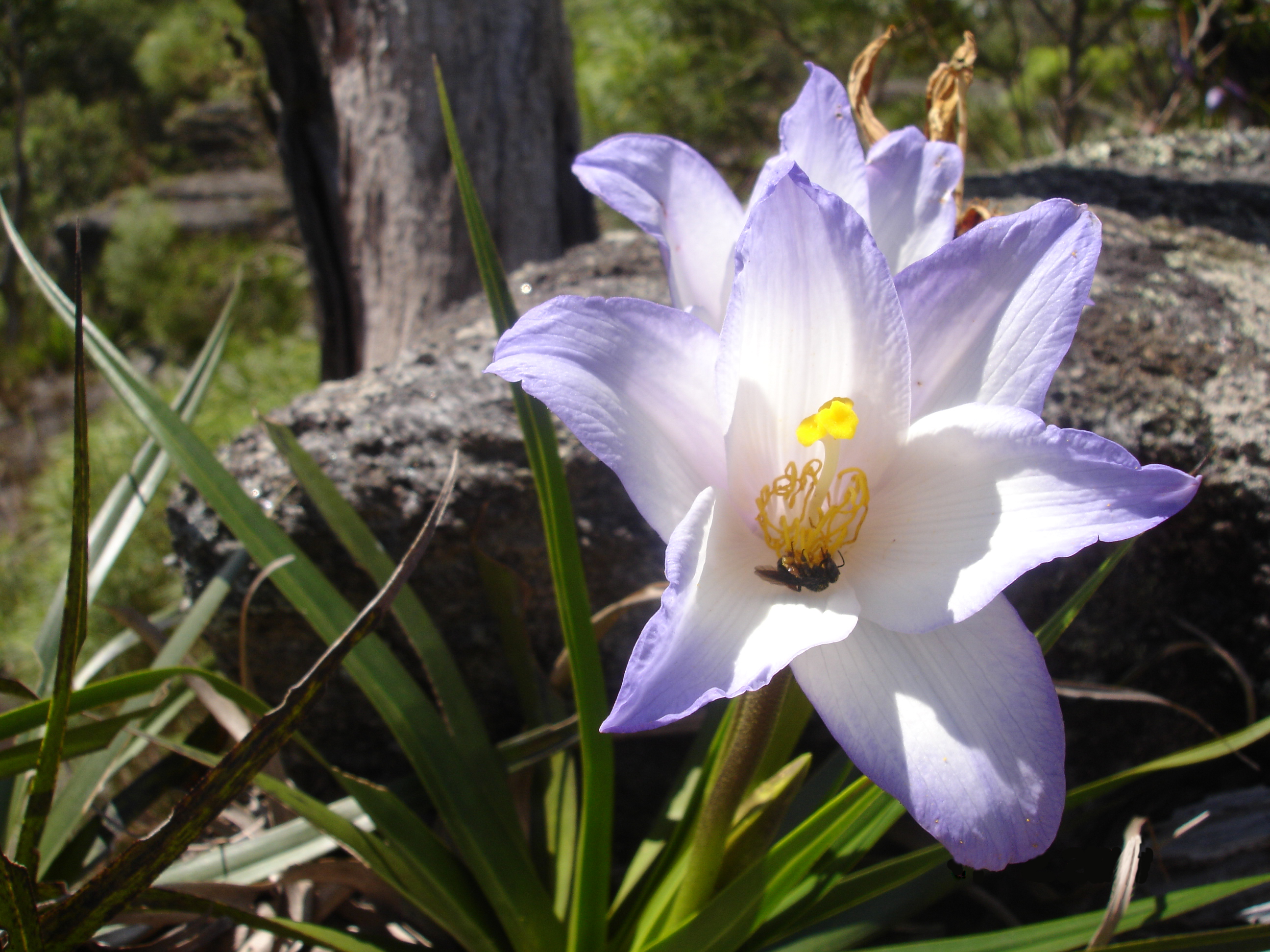
Vellozia with a visiting pollinator

Both cross and self pollination are observed inside the family, and the process is accomplished in various manners. Pollinators of Vellozia include the common honeybee (Apis mellifera) and different species of solitary bees as Megachile curvipes, Psaenythia sp. and Augochlora metallica. The reward is pollen which is much more abundant than nectar. Nectar in the genus contains very low concentration of sugars. Bees use the three lobed stigma as a landing platform, and visually orient towards it. When the tepals are removed, bees will visit the flowers, but when the stigma is removed, no pollinators are recorded. It was found that hummingbirds visit these plants despite the diluted composition of nectar. Barbacenia differs in that its nectar is more abundant than its pollen. The pollen is probably taken by carpenter ants but whether ants are successful pollinators is not known. Pollen grains in Barbacenia are smaller, and these insects may be able to carry them and leave some on the stigma while they are searching for nectar.

== Fruits and seeds ==
Fruits and seeds of these plants appear in large variety of shapes and sizes which demonstrate adaptations enhancing dispersal. Such adaptations include the development of bristles or hooks (Talbotia elegans) that cover the seed capsule. This allows attachment to animals, making the seeds able to travel long distances. Another characteristic is that the capsule is sticky, which also helps it to attach.
