= List of Brachyceridae genera =

These 155 genera belong to Brachyceridae, a family of snout and bark beetles in the order Coleoptera. There are at least 120 described species in Brachyceridae.

== Brachyceridae genera ==
- Absoloniella Formanek, 1913^{c g}
- Acentroides ^{c g}
- Afghanocryptus Voss, 1961^{c g}
- Afroryzophilus Lyal, 1990^{c g}
- Aganeuma Broun, 1893^{c g}
- Alaocephala Ganglbauer, 1906^{c g}
- Alaocyba Perris, 1869^{c g}
- Alaocybites Gilbert, 1956^{i c g b}
- Alhypera ^{c g}
- Anchonoides ^{c g}
- Aonychus Schönherr, 1844^{c g}
- Aoratolcus Kuschel, 1952^{c g}
- Apachiscelus ^{c g}
- Aplopus ^{c g}
- Aralkumia Baitenov, 1974^{c g}
- Araxus Marshall, 1955^{c g}
- Argentinorhynchus Brèthes, 1910^{c g}
- Arthrostenus Schonherr, 1826^{c g}
- Athor Broun, 1909^{c g}
- Baeosomus Broun, 1904^{c g}
- Bagoidellus Hustache, 1929^{c g}
- Bagoidus Kuschel, 1956^{c g}
- Bagoopsis Faust, 1881^{c g}
- Bordoniola Osella, 1987^{c g}
- Brachybamus Germar, 1835^{i c g b}
- Brachycerus Olivier, 1789^{i c g}
- Brachypus ^{c g}
- Brotheus Stephens, 1829^{c g}
- Bryocatus Broun, 1915^{c g}
- Byrsops Germar, 1829^{c g}
- Caenosilapillus Chûjô & Morimoto, 1959^{c g}
- Callodus Hustache, 1932^{c g}
- Coiffaitiella Osella, 1971^{g}
- Colabotelus Broun, 1914^{c g}
- Colchis ^{c g}
- Colobotelus ^{c g}
- Creterhirhinus Legalov, 2010^{g}
- Cretulio Zherichin, 1993^{c g}
- Cryptops ^{c g}
- Ctylindra Pascoe, 1885^{c g}
- Cyrtobagous Hustache, 1929^{i c g b}
- Daulaxius ^{c g}
- Daylesfordia ^{c g}
- Degorsia ^{c g}
- Derosasius ^{c}
- Desmidophorinus Hubenthal, 1917^{c g}
- Desmidophorus Schönherr, 1837^{c g}
- Drongis Fairmaire, 1901^{c g}
- Dyerocera ^{c g}
- Echinocnemus Schoenherr, 1843^{c g}
- Endaliscus Kirsch, 1873^{c g}
- Endalus ^{c g}
- Erirhigous Fairmaire, 1898^{c g}
- Erirhinus ^{c g}
- Erirrhinites Britton, 1960^{g}
- Erycus ^{c g}
- Euprocas Broun, 1893^{c g}
- Euretus Péringuey, 1896^{c g}
- Euryxena Pascoe, 1887^{c g}
- Ferreria Alonso-Zarazaga & Lyal, 1999^{c g}
- Gilbertiola Osella, 1982^{i g b}
- Glaridorrhinus ^{c g}
- Grasidius Champion, 1902^{c g}
- Grypidius ^{c g}
- Grypus Germar, 1817^{i c g b}
- Helodytes Kuschel, 1952^{c g}
- Hexeria Pascoe, 1885^{c g}
- Himasthlophallus Zherikhin & Egorov, 1990^{c g}
- Homeostenodema Hustache, 1929^{c g}
- Homosomus Richard, 1956^{c g}
- Hoplitotrachelus Schönherr, 1847^{c g}
- Hydronomidius Faust, 1898^{c g}
- Hydrotimetes Kolbe, 1911^{c g}
- Hypoglyptus Gerstacker, 1855^{c g}
- Hypselus Schönherr, 1843^{c g}
- Icaris Tournier, 1874^{c g}
- Ilyodytes Kuschel, 1951^{c g}
- Ixodicus ^{c g}
- Jekelia Tournier, 1874^{c g}
- Kandaphila Hustache, 1933^{c g}
- Lepidonotaris ^{c}
- Liasotus ^{c g}
- Lissorhoptrus LeConte, 1876^{i c g b} (rice water weevils)
- Lostianus Desbrochers, 1900^{c g}
- Monius ^{c g}
- Myrtonymus Kuschel, 1990^{g}
- Nannilipus ^{c g}
- Neiphagus ^{c g}
- Nemopteryx ^{c g}
- Neobagoidus O'Brien, 1990^{b}
- Neobagous Hustache, 1926^{c g b}
- Neochetina Hustache, 1926^{i c g b} (waterhyacinth weevils)
- Neogeobyrsa ^{c g}
- Neohydronomus Hustache, 1926^{c g b}
- Neoicaris ^{c g}
- Neonotaris Hustache, 1936^{c g}
- Neoubychia Gilbert & Howden, 1987^{c g}
- Niphobolus Blackburn, 1893^{c g}
- Notaris Germar, 1817^{i c g b}
- Notiodes Schönherr, 1838^{i c g b}
- Notiophilus Duméril, 1805^{i c g}
- Notodermus ^{c g}
- Numitor Scudder, 1893^{c g}
- Ochetina Pascoe, 1881^{c g}
- Ochodontus Desbrochers, 1897^{c g}
- Ocladius Schoenherr, 1825^{c g}
- Onychylis LeConte, 1876^{i c g b}
- Oryzophagus Kuschel, 1951^{c g}
- Palmatodes ^{c g}
- Pantoteloides ^{c g}
- Paocryptorrhinus Voss, 1965^{c g}
- Paramonius ^{c g}
- Pararaymondionymus ^{c g}
- Penestes Schönherr, 1825^{c g}
- Philacta Broun, 1880^{c g}
- Picia Tournier, 1895^{c g}
- Picianus Zumpt, 1929^{c g}
- Prionochelus ^{c g}
- Procas Stephens, 1831^{i c g b}
- Progradivus Haaf, 1957^{c g}
- Prolobodontus ^{c g}
- Protomantis Schoenherr, 1840^{c g}
- Pseudypera ^{c g}
- Pyraechmes ^{c g}
- Raymondia ^{c g}
- Raymondiellus Ganglbauer, 1906^{c g}
- Raymondionymus Wollaston, 1873^{c g}
- Remaudierella Hoffmann, 1954^{c g}
- Schizomicrus Casey, 1905^{i c g b}
- Siraton Hustache, 1934^{c g}
- Sitanus Cristofori & Jan, 1832^{c g}
- Stenopelmus Schönherr, 1835^{i c g b}
- Stilbopsis Broun, 1893^{c g}
- Synthocus Schönherr, 1842^{c g}
- Syrdariella Ter-Minassian, 1978^{c g}
- Tadius Pascoe, 1885^{c g}
- Tanysphyrus Germar, 1817^{i c g b}
- Tarattostichus Ganglbauer, 1906^{c g}
- Tetracyphus Chevrolat, 1881^{c g}
- Theanellus Reitter, 1913^{c g}
- Theates Fåhraeus, 1871^{c g}
- Theatomorphus Haaf, 1958^{c g}
- Thecorrhinus ^{c g}
- Thryogenes Bedel, 1884^{c g}
- Thryogenosoma Voss, 1953^{g}
- Tournotaris Alonso-Zarazaga & Lyal, 1999^{c g b}
- Trichocaulus Fairmaire, 1877^{c g}
- Trichosomus ^{c g}
- Tsherepanovia Korotyaev, 1991^{c g}
- Turanocryptus Korotyaev, 1987^{c g}
- Turonerirhinus Legalov, 2014^{g}
- Tychiops Kuschel, 1955^{c g}
- Tyrodomus Voss, 1971^{c g}
- Ubychia Rost, 1881^{c g}
- Xeronoma Iablokoff-Khnzorian, 1964^{c g}

Data sources: i = ITIS, c = Catalogue of Life, g = GBIF, b = Bugguide.net
