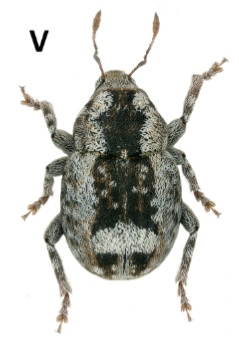

Scientific classification
- Kingdom: Animalia
- Phylum: Arthropoda
- Class: Insecta
- Order: Coleoptera
- Suborder: Polyphaga
- Infraorder: Cucujiformia
- Family: Brachyceridae
- Genus: Cryptolarynx
- Species: C. san

Binomial name
- Cryptolarynx san Haran, 2023

= Cryptolarynx san =

Species of beetle

Cryptolarynx san is a species of beetle of the family Curculionidae. It is found in South Africa, where it has been recorded from various locations of the West Coast, in Bokpunt and near the West Coast National Park.

== Description ==
Adults reach a length of about 2.7–3.6 mm and have an integument black body, with the antennae, tibiae and tarsi reddish.

== Biology ==
Specimens were collected in the vicinity of stands of various species of Oxalis (Oxalis obtusa, Oxalis luteola and Oxalis hirta), but the exact host plant is unkonown. Specimens were collected in July and September. Compared with the other species of the genus, the adults of C. san can move very fast on the ground.

== Etymology ==
This species is named in honour of the San people, the first inhabitants of southern Africa.
