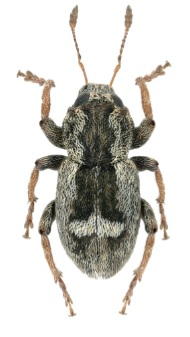

Scientific classification
- Kingdom: Animalia
- Phylum: Arthropoda
- Class: Insecta
- Order: Coleoptera
- Suborder: Polyphaga
- Infraorder: Cucujiformia
- Family: Brachyceridae
- Genus: Hadrocryptolarynx
- Species: H. major

Binomial name
- Hadrocryptolarynx major Haran, 2023

= Hadrocryptolarynx major =

Species of beetle

Hadrocryptolarynx major is a species of beetle of the family Curculionidae. It is found in South Africa, where it has been recorded from the northwestern regions of the Western Cape province, from Koekenaap to Velddrif and inland to Vanrhynsdorp and Worcester.

== Description ==
Adults reach a length of about 2.0–6 mm and have an integument black body, with the antennae, tibiae and tarsi generally reddish.

== Biology ==
Specimens were collected in dense stands of Oxalis luteola, most specimens collected from the base of the plants. As in Cryptolarynx, some specimens were observed to form small holes in the soil, below the leaves of various surrounding plants. The weevils are active during the day on open fields but may also climb onto vegetation. Adults were collected between July and September.

== Etymology ==
This species name refers to the large body size of some specimens of the species, seemingly the largest among the Cryptolaryngini.
