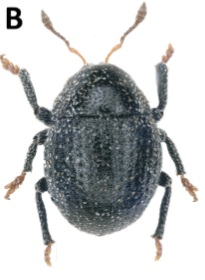

Scientific classification
- Kingdom: Animalia
- Phylum: Arthropoda
- Class: Insecta
- Order: Coleoptera
- Suborder: Polyphaga
- Infraorder: Cucujiformia
- Family: Brachyceridae
- Genus: Cryptolarynx
- Species: C. subglaber

Binomial name
- Cryptolarynx subglaber Haran, 2023

= Cryptolarynx subglaber =

Species of beetle

Cryptolarynx subglaber is a species of beetle of the family Curculionidae. It is found in South Africa, where it has been recorded on the western slopes of the Hottentots Holland Mountains, in Stellenbosch and the Helderberg Nature Reserve.

== Description ==
Adults reach a length of about 1.8–3.7 mm and have an integument black body, with the antennae and tarsi reddish.

== Biology ==
Specimens were collected in mixed patches of species of Oxalis (Oxalis lanata, Oxalis glabra and Oxalis purpurea), but the exact host plant of the species is unknown. Adults were collected in August and October.

== Etymology ==
This species is named in reference to the glabrous appearance of the integument, seemingly unique among known species of Cryptolarynx.
