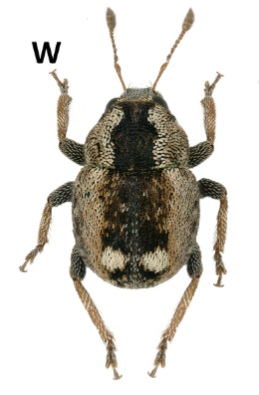

Scientific classification
- Kingdom: Animalia
- Phylum: Arthropoda
- Class: Insecta
- Order: Coleoptera
- Suborder: Polyphaga
- Infraorder: Cucujiformia
- Family: Brachyceridae
- Genus: Cryptolarynx
- Species: C. luteipennis

Binomial name
- Cryptolarynx luteipennis Haran, 2023

= Cryptolarynx luteipennis =

Species of beetle

Cryptolarynx luteipennis is a species of beetle of the family Curculionidae. It is found in South Africa, where it has been recorded from the West Coast between Velddrif and the Clanwilliam area.

== Description ==
Adults reach a length of about 1.8–2.6 mm and have an integument black body, with the antennae, tibiae and tarsi reddish.

== Biology ==
Specimens were collected in the vicinity of stands of various species of Oxalis (including Oxalis obtusa), but the exact host plant of the species has not been identified. All specimens were collected in July and August.

== Etymology ==
This species name refers to the orange or yellowish shades on elytra on many specimens of this species. These colours are seemingly unique to this species and provide an efficient camouflage of adults on the pinkish-orange sand on which they were found near Graafwater.
