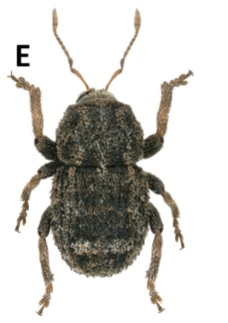

Scientific classification
- Kingdom: Animalia
- Phylum: Arthropoda
- Class: Insecta
- Order: Coleoptera
- Suborder: Polyphaga
- Infraorder: Cucujiformia
- Family: Brachyceridae
- Genus: Cryptolarynx
- Species: C. hirtulus

Binomial name
- Cryptolarynx hirtulus Haran, 2023

= Cryptolarynx hirtulus =

Species of beetle

Cryptolarynx hirtulus is a species of beetle of the family Curculionidae. It is found in South Africa, where it is only known from the type locality, near Vanrhynsdorp in the Western Cape Province.

== Description ==
Adults reach a length of about 2–2.6 mm and have an integument black body, with the antennae, tarsi and sometimes tibiae reddish.

== Biology ==
Specimens were collected at several localities in homogenous stands of Oxalis obtusa. Some were extracted from galleries in the soil, emerging from the bulbs. Adults were collected between July and September, with freshly emerged specimens encountered in July and August.

== Etymology ==
The species name is derived from the Latin adjective hirtus (meaning hairy) and refers to the suberect scales in the strial punctures, which give the species a slightly hairy appearance.
