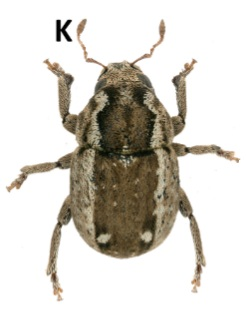

Scientific classification
- Kingdom: Animalia
- Phylum: Arthropoda
- Class: Insecta
- Order: Coleoptera
- Suborder: Polyphaga
- Infraorder: Cucujiformia
- Family: Brachyceridae
- Genus: Cryptolarynx
- Species: C. pyrophilus

Binomial name
- Cryptolarynx pyrophilus Haran, 2023

= Cryptolarynx pyrophilus =

Species of beetle

Cryptolarynx pyrophilus is a species of beetle of the family Curculionidae. It is found in South Africa, where it occurs in inland valleys of Montagu and the Hex River.

== Description ==
Adults reach a length of about 1.5–4.5 mm and have an integument black body, with the antennae and tarsi reddish.

== Biology ==
Specimens were collected in and close to a recently burnt area (seven months prior to sampling), at the bases of emerging Oxalis pes-caprae plants. The heat tolerance of this species was assessed in a comparative study of weevils associated with fire-prone ecosystems, but the adults showed a lower tolerance to heat than those of Cryptolarynx variabilis. Adults were collected in September and October.

== Etymology ==
This species name refers to the migration of specimens towards recently burnt areas and is formed from combining the Greek nouns pyr (meaning fire) and philia (meaning affection).
