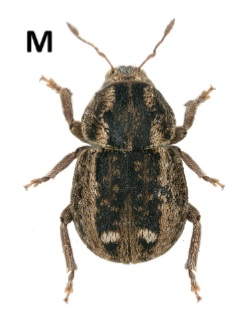

Scientific classification
- Kingdom: Animalia
- Phylum: Arthropoda
- Class: Insecta
- Order: Coleoptera
- Suborder: Polyphaga
- Infraorder: Cucujiformia
- Family: Brachyceridae
- Genus: Cryptolarynx
- Species: C. armatus

Binomial name
- Cryptolarynx armatus Haran, 2023

= Cryptolarynx armatus =

Species of beetle

Cryptolarynx armatus is a species of beetle of the family Curculionidae. It is found in South Africa, where it is only known from the type locality near Nieuwoudtville.

== Description ==
Adults reach a length of about 1.5–3.5 mm and have an integument black body, with the scapes, tibiae and tarsi reddish.

== Biology ==
Specimens were collected in August, in stands of Oxalis obtusa and O. cf. suteroides.

== Etymology ==
This species name refers to the apical cuticular expansion of the protibiae of the males, forming together with the mucro two strong teeth.
