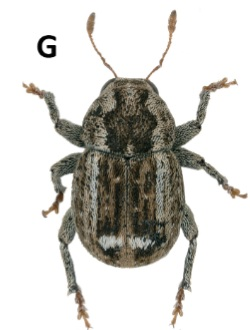

Scientific classification
- Kingdom: Animalia
- Phylum: Arthropoda
- Class: Insecta
- Order: Coleoptera
- Suborder: Polyphaga
- Infraorder: Cucujiformia
- Family: Brachyceridae
- Genus: Cryptolarynx
- Species: C. namaquanus

Binomial name
- Cryptolarynx namaquanus Haran, 2023

= Cryptolarynx namaquanus =

Species of beetle

Cryptolarynx namaquanus is a species of beetle of the Curculionidae family. It is found in South Africa, where it is only known from the type locality in the Northern Cape Province.

== Description ==
Adults reach a length of about 2–3 mm and have an integument black body, with the antennae and tarsi reddish.

== Biology ==
Specimens were collected in monospecific stands of Oxalis obtusa in the month of August.

== Etymology ==
The species name refers to the area where this species was found, the Namaqualand region of the Northern Cape province and part of the traditional home of the Nama people.
