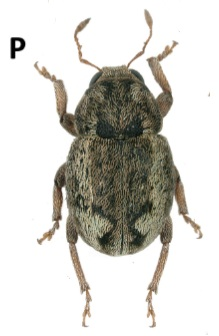

Scientific classification
- Kingdom: Animalia
- Phylum: Arthropoda
- Class: Insecta
- Order: Coleoptera
- Suborder: Polyphaga
- Infraorder: Cucujiformia
- Family: Brachyceridae
- Genus: Cryptolarynx
- Species: C. spinicornis

Binomial name
- Cryptolarynx spinicornis Haran, 2023

= Cryptolarynx spinicornis =

Species of beetle

Cryptolarynx spinicornis is a species of beetle of the family Curculionidae. It is found in South Africa, where it occurs in the Vanrhynsdorp area and up to 1500 meters above sea level on the Great Escarpment near Sutherland.

== Description ==
Adults reach a length of about 1.7–3 mm and have an integument black body, with the antennae, tarsi and sometimes tibiae reddish.

== Biology ==
Specimens were collected at the bases of plants of Oxalis cf. luteola and O. cf. odorata at sites where Oxalis obtusa was also present.

== Etymology ==
This species name is derived from the Latin nouns spina (meaning spine) and cornu (meaning horn, antenna) and refers to the teeth on funicle segments 2 and 4 in this species.
