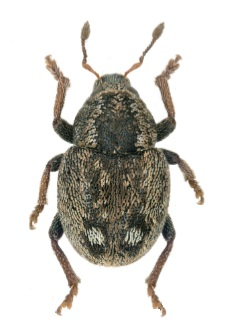

Scientific classification
- Kingdom: Animalia
- Phylum: Arthropoda
- Class: Insecta
- Order: Coleoptera
- Suborder: Polyphaga
- Infraorder: Cucujiformia
- Family: Brachyceridae
- Genus: Cryptolarynx
- Species: C. oberprieleri

Binomial name
- Cryptolarynx oberprieleri Haran, 2023

= Cryptolarynx oberprieleri =

Species of beetle

Cryptolarynx oberprieleri is a species of beetle of the family Curculionidae. It is found in South Africa, where it has been recorded on the western slopes of the Hottentots Holland Mountain range and adjacent valleys, from Stellenbosch and Klipheuwel in the north to Kogel Bay beach in the south. A single specimen was discovered in the De Hoop Nature Reserve.

== Description ==
Adults reach a length of about 1.9–3.2 mm and have an integument black body, with the scapes and tarsi reddish.

== Biology ==
Specimens were collected at several localities in monospecific stands of Oxalis glabra and, at one location, at the base of a plant of Oxalis livida. Larvae and teneral adults were found inside bulbs of O. glabra. Adults were collected between late June and late October, found to be active during the day at the base of their host plant but at sunset retreating into small holes in the soil, which they formed under debris and under the leaves of Iridaceae.

== Etymology ==
This species is named in honour of Rolf G. Oberprieler for his contribution to weevil taxonomy and classification, not least regarding the South African fauna.
