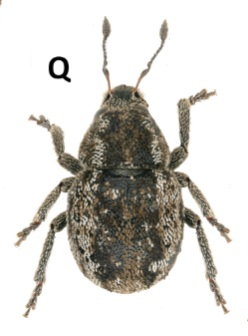

Scientific classification
- Kingdom: Animalia
- Phylum: Arthropoda
- Class: Insecta
- Order: Coleoptera
- Suborder: Polyphaga
- Infraorder: Cucujiformia
- Family: Brachyceridae
- Genus: Cryptolarynx
- Species: C. cederbergensis

Binomial name
- Cryptolarynx cederbergensis Haran, 2023

= Cryptolarynx cederbergensis =

Species of beetle

Cryptolarynx cederbergensis is a species of beetle of the family Curculionidae. It is found in South Africa, where it is only known from the Cederberg mountains in the Western Cape province.

== Description ==
Adults reach a length of about 1.9–2.2 mm and have an integument black body, with the basal half of scapes reddish.

== Biology ==
Specimens were collected in monospecific stands of Oxalis obtusa in the month of August.

== Etymology ==
This species name refers to the origin of this species, the Cederberg mountains in the Western Cape province.
