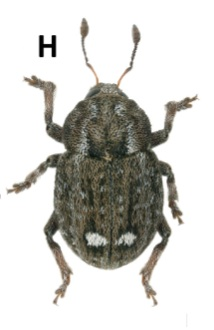

Scientific classification
- Kingdom: Animalia
- Phylum: Arthropoda
- Class: Insecta
- Order: Coleoptera
- Suborder: Polyphaga
- Infraorder: Cucujiformia
- Family: Brachyceridae
- Genus: Cryptolarynx
- Species: C. carinatus

Binomial name
- Cryptolarynx carinatus Haran, 2023

= Cryptolarynx carinatus =

Species of beetle

Cryptolarynx carinatus is a species of beetle of the family Curculionidae. It is found in South Africa, where it is only known from Rondebosch Common and Constantia in Cape Town.

== Description ==
Adults reach a length of about 2.7–3 mm and have an integument black body, with the scapes and tarsi reddish.

== Biology ==
Specimens were collected at the base of Oxalis purpurea plants, in the month of June.

== Etymology ==
The species name refers to the distinct proximal inner carina of the metatibiae in this species.
