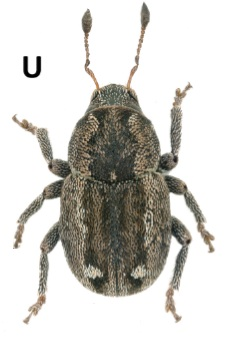

Scientific classification
- Kingdom: Animalia
- Phylum: Arthropoda
- Class: Insecta
- Order: Coleoptera
- Suborder: Polyphaga
- Infraorder: Cucujiformia
- Family: Brachyceridae
- Genus: Cryptolarynx
- Species: C. oberlanderi

Binomial name
- Cryptolarynx oberlanderi Haran, 2023

= Cryptolarynx oberlanderi =

Species of beetle

Cryptolarynx oberlanderi is a species of beetle of the family Curculionidae. It is found in South Africa, where it is only known from the Hex River valley and the Worcester area.

== Description ==
Adults reach a length of about 2.1–3 mm and have an integument black body, with the scapes and tarsi reddish.

== Biology ==
Specimens were collected in July, at the base of plants of Oxalis depressa.

== Etymology ==
This species is named in honour of Kenneth Oberlander, specialist of the taxonomy of the genus Oxalis.
