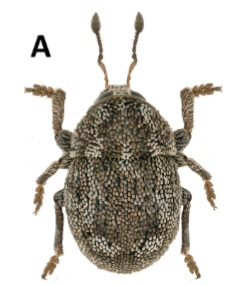

Scientific classification
- Kingdom: Animalia
- Phylum: Arthropoda
- Class: Insecta
- Order: Coleoptera
- Suborder: Polyphaga
- Infraorder: Cucujiformia
- Family: Brachyceridae
- Genus: Cryptolarynx
- Species: C. vitis

Binomial name
- Cryptolarynx vitis (Marshall, 1957)

Synonyms
- Cryptopharynx vitis Marshall, 1957

= Cryptolarynx vitis =

Species of beetle

Cryptolarynx vitis is a species of beetle of the family Curculionidae. It is found in South Africa, where it occurs in lowland valleys of the Cape Town area, from Cape Town to Malmesbury and Wellington in the north and to Gansbaai in the south-east.

== Description ==
Adults reach a length of about 1.6–3.6 mm and have an integument black body, with the scapes and tarsi reddish.

== Biology ==
Specimens have been collected in monospecific stands of Oxalis glabra at various sites, but it was not reared from the bulbs of this plant species and its exact association with this species of Oxalis needs verification. Adults were mostly found between August and November but once, in a population at Wellington, in January and February.
