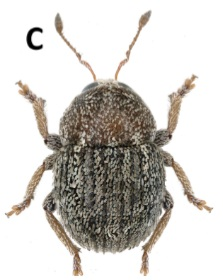

Scientific classification
- Kingdom: Animalia
- Phylum: Arthropoda
- Class: Insecta
- Order: Coleoptera
- Suborder: Polyphaga
- Infraorder: Cucujiformia
- Family: Brachyceridae
- Genus: Cryptolarynx
- Species: C. squamulatus

Binomial name
- Cryptolarynx squamulatus Haran, 2023

= Cryptolarynx squamulatus =

Species of beetle

Cryptolarynx squamulatus is a species of beetle of the family Curculionidae. It is found in South Africa, where it occurs in the West Coast National Park, Postberg Section.

== Description ==
Adults reach a length of about 1.9 mm and have an integument black body, with the antennae and tarsi reddish.

== Biology ==
Specimens were collected in a patch of Oxalis obtusa, but the exact host association of the species was not verified. Freshly emerged adults were found in October.

== Etymology ==
This species is named in reference to the dense cover of suberect scales (squamae) on its elytra.
