= Gilbertia =

Gilbertia may refer to:

- Gilbertia (mollusc), a genus of molluscs
- Gilbertiola, a genus of weevils originally described as Gilbertia
- Hypoplectrodes, a genus of serranid fish
- Walsinghamiella, a genus of moths originally described as Gilbertia
