= Lissorhoptrus lacustris =

Scientific classification
- Domain: Eukaryota
- Kingdom: Animalia
- Phylum: Arthropoda
- Class: Insecta
- Order: Coleoptera
- Suborder: Polyphaga
- Infraorder: Cucujiformia
- Family: Brachyceridae
- Tribe: Stenopelmini
- Genus: Lissorhoptrus
- Species: L. lacustris

Binomial name
- Lissorhoptrus lacustris Kuschel, 1952

Species of beetle

Lissorhoptrus lacustris is a species of marsh weevil in the beetle family Brachyceridae. It is found in North America.
