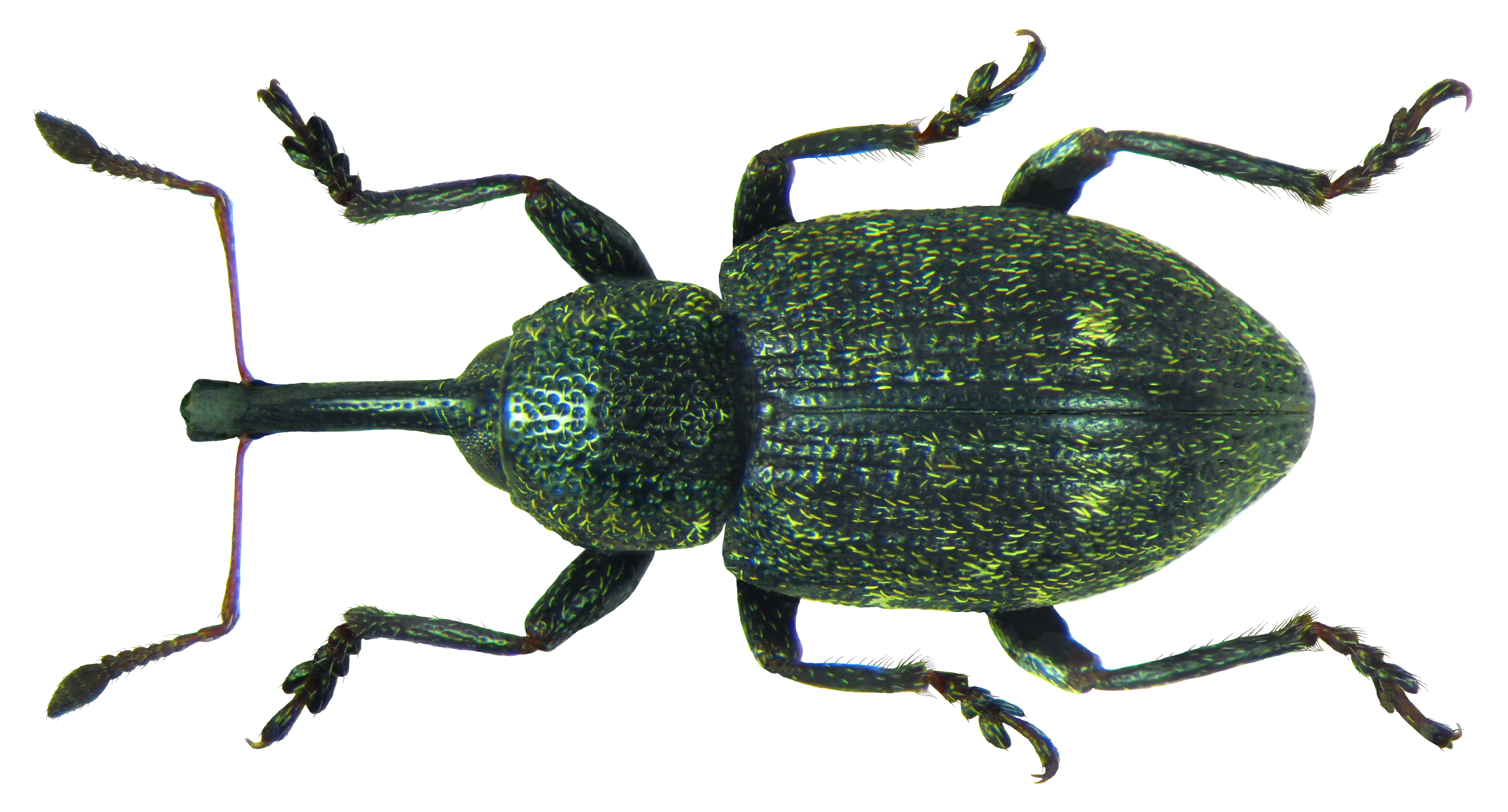
- Notaris acridulus 3-4 mm

Scientific classification
- Kingdom: Animalia
- Phylum: Arthropoda
- Class: Insecta
- Order: Coleoptera
- Suborder: Polyphaga
- Infraorder: Cucujiformia
- Family: Brachyceridae
- Genus: Notaris
- Species: N. acridulus

Binomial name
- Notaris acridulus (Linnaeus, 1758)

= Notaris acridulus =

Species of beetle

Notaris acridulus is a species of weevil native to Europe.
