= Gilbertiola helferi =

Scientific classification
- Domain: Eukaryota
- Kingdom: Animalia
- Phylum: Arthropoda
- Class: Insecta
- Order: Coleoptera
- Suborder: Polyphaga
- Infraorder: Cucujiformia
- Family: Brachyceridae
- Genus: Gilbertiola
- Species: G. helferi

Binomial name
- Gilbertiola helferi (Gilbert, 1956)

Species of beetle

Gilbertiola helferi is a species of beetle in the family Brachyceridae. It is found in North America.
