= Gryphus =

Gryphus may refer to:

- Gryphus, the Griffin
- Gryphus (brachiopod), a genus of brachiopods in the family Terebratulidae
- Gryphus, a genus of bivalves in the family Chamidae, synonym of Chama
- Gryphus, a genus of beetles in the family Terebratulidae, synonym of Grypus
