= Onychylis longulus =

Scientific classification
- Kingdom: Animalia
- Phylum: Arthropoda
- Class: Insecta
- Order: Coleoptera
- Suborder: Polyphaga
- Infraorder: Cucujiformia
- Family: Brachyceridae
- Genus: Onychylis
- Species: O. longulus

Binomial name
- Onychylis longulus LeConte, 1876

Species of beetle

Onychylis longulus is a species of marsh weevil in the beetle family Brachyceridae. It is found in North America.
