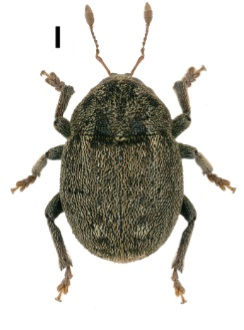

Scientific classification
- Kingdom: Animalia
- Phylum: Arthropoda
- Class: Insecta
- Order: Coleoptera
- Suborder: Polyphaga
- Infraorder: Cucujiformia
- Family: Brachyceridae
- Genus: Cryptolarynx
- Species: C. variabilis

Binomial name
- Cryptolarynx variabilis Haran, 2023

= Cryptolarynx variabilis =

Species of beetle

Cryptolarynx variabilis is a species of beetle of the family Curculionidae. It is found in South Africa, where it seems to be restricted to the western slope of the Hottentots Holland Mountains range, from the Franschhoek Pass to Somerset West.

== Description ==
Adults reach a length of about 2.2–4 mm and have an integument black body, with the scapes and tarsi reddish.

== Biology ==
The larvae of develop in the bulbs of various species of Oxalis (Oxalis pes-caprae, Oxalis purpurea and Oxalis lanata). Adults were collected between July and October. The heat tolerance of this species was assessed in a comparative study of weevils associated with fire-prone ecosystems. Adults were found to survive temperatures above 50°C, which is rare for arthropods, especially in small insects.

== Etymology ==
The species name refers to the substantial morphological variation encountered in this species in terms of size, body ratios and elytral pattern.
