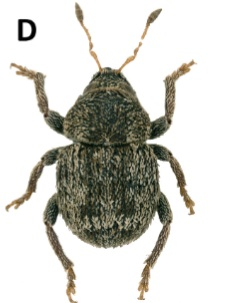

Scientific classification
- Kingdom: Animalia
- Phylum: Arthropoda
- Class: Insecta
- Order: Coleoptera
- Suborder: Polyphaga
- Infraorder: Cucujiformia
- Family: Brachyceridae
- Genus: Cryptolarynx
- Species: C. muellerae

Binomial name
- Cryptolarynx muellerae Haran, 2023

= Cryptolarynx muellerae =

Species of beetle

Cryptolarynx muellerae is a species of beetle of the family Curculionidae. It is found in South Africa, where it is only known from the type locality, near Vanrhynsdorp in the Western Cape Province.

== Description ==
Adults reach a length of about 2–2.2 mm and have an integument black body, with the antennae, tibiae and tarsi reddish.

== Etymology ==
The species is named in honour of Ruth Müller, entomologist and collection manager at the Ditsong National Museum of Natural History in Pretoria.
