= Onychylis parvulus =

Scientific classification
- Domain: Eukaryota
- Kingdom: Animalia
- Phylum: Arthropoda
- Class: Insecta
- Order: Coleoptera
- Suborder: Polyphaga
- Infraorder: Cucujiformia
- Family: Brachyceridae
- Subfamily: Erirhininae
- Genus: Onychylis
- Species: O. parvulus

Binomial name
- Onychylis parvulus Burke, 1961

Species of beetle

Onychylis parvulus is a species of marsh weevil in the beetle family Brachyceridae. It is found in North America.
