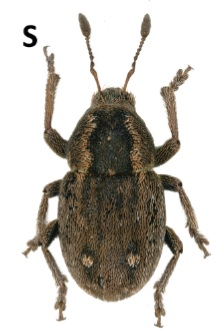

Scientific classification
- Kingdom: Animalia
- Phylum: Arthropoda
- Class: Insecta
- Order: Coleoptera
- Suborder: Polyphaga
- Infraorder: Cucujiformia
- Family: Brachyceridae
- Genus: Cryptolarynx
- Species: C. marshalli

Binomial name
- Cryptolarynx marshalli Haran, 2023

= Cryptolarynx marshalli =

Species of beetle

Cryptolarynx marshalli is a species of beetle of the family Curculionidae. It is found in South Africa, where it is only known from the Western Cape Province.

== Description ==
Adults reach a length of about 2.5–2.9 mm and have an integument black body, with the antennae, tibiae and tarsi reddish.

== Biology ==
Specimens were collected in July at the base of Oxalis imbricata.

== Etymology ==
This species is named in honour of weevil expert Sir Guy A.K. Marshall, who described the genus and its original two species and discussed its unique characters among known weevils.
