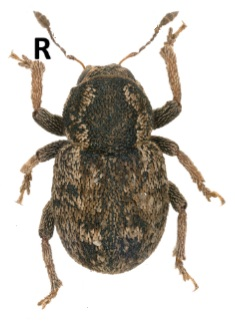

Scientific classification
- Kingdom: Animalia
- Phylum: Arthropoda
- Class: Insecta
- Order: Coleoptera
- Suborder: Polyphaga
- Infraorder: Cucujiformia
- Family: Brachyceridae
- Genus: Cryptolarynx
- Species: C. homaroides

Binomial name
- Cryptolarynx homaroides Haran, 2023

= Cryptolarynx homaroides =

Species of beetle

Cryptolarynx homaroides is a species of beetle of the family Curculionidae. It is found in South Africa, where it is only known from the Springbok area in the Northern Cape province.

== Description ==
Adults reach a length of about 2.3 mm and have an integument black body, with the base of the scapes, tibiae and tarsi reddish reddish.

== Etymology ==
This species name is derived from the genus name of the European Lobster (Homarus gammarus) and refers to the remarkably similar shape of copulatory sclerite in the endophallus of this species.
