= Onychylis nigrirostris =

Scientific classification
- Kingdom: Animalia
- Phylum: Arthropoda
- Class: Insecta
- Order: Coleoptera
- Suborder: Polyphaga
- Infraorder: Cucujiformia
- Family: Brachyceridae
- Subfamily: Erirhininae
- Genus: Onychylis
- Species: O. nigrirostris

Binomial name
- Onychylis nigrirostris (Boheman, 1843)

Species of beetle

Onychylis nigrirostris, the pickerelweed weevil, is a species of marsh weevil in the beetle family Brachyceridae.
