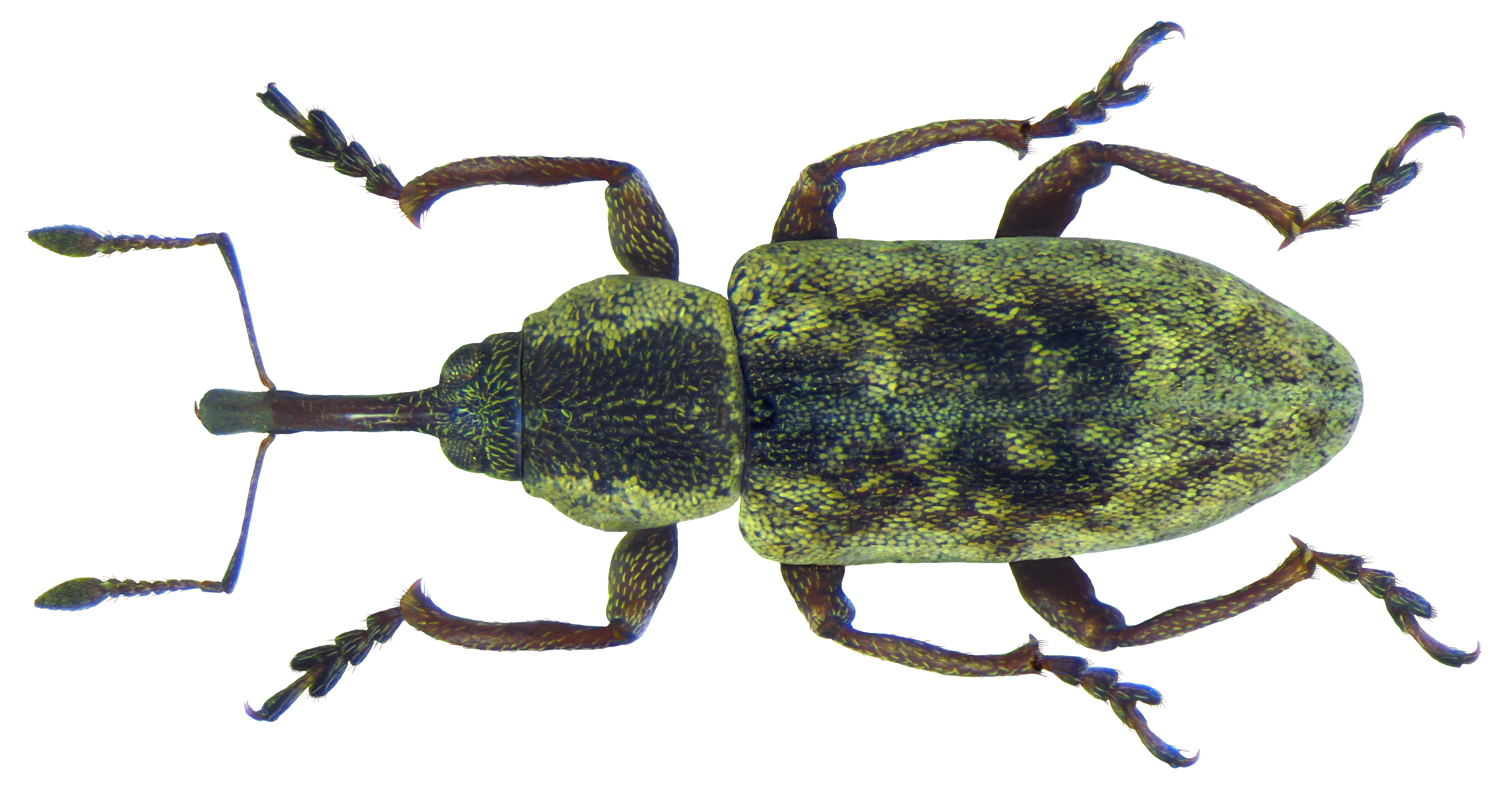
- Thryogenes nereis 3-4,5 mm

Scientific classification
- Kingdom: Animalia
- Phylum: Arthropoda
- Clade: Pancrustacea
- Class: Insecta
- Order: Coleoptera
- Suborder: Polyphaga
- Infraorder: Cucujiformia
- Superfamily: Curculionoidea
- Family: Brachyceridae
- Genus: Thryogenes
- Species: T. nereis

Binomial name
- Thryogenes nereis (Paykull, 1792)

= Thryogenes nereis =

Species of beetle

Thryogenes nereis is a species of weevil native to Europe.
