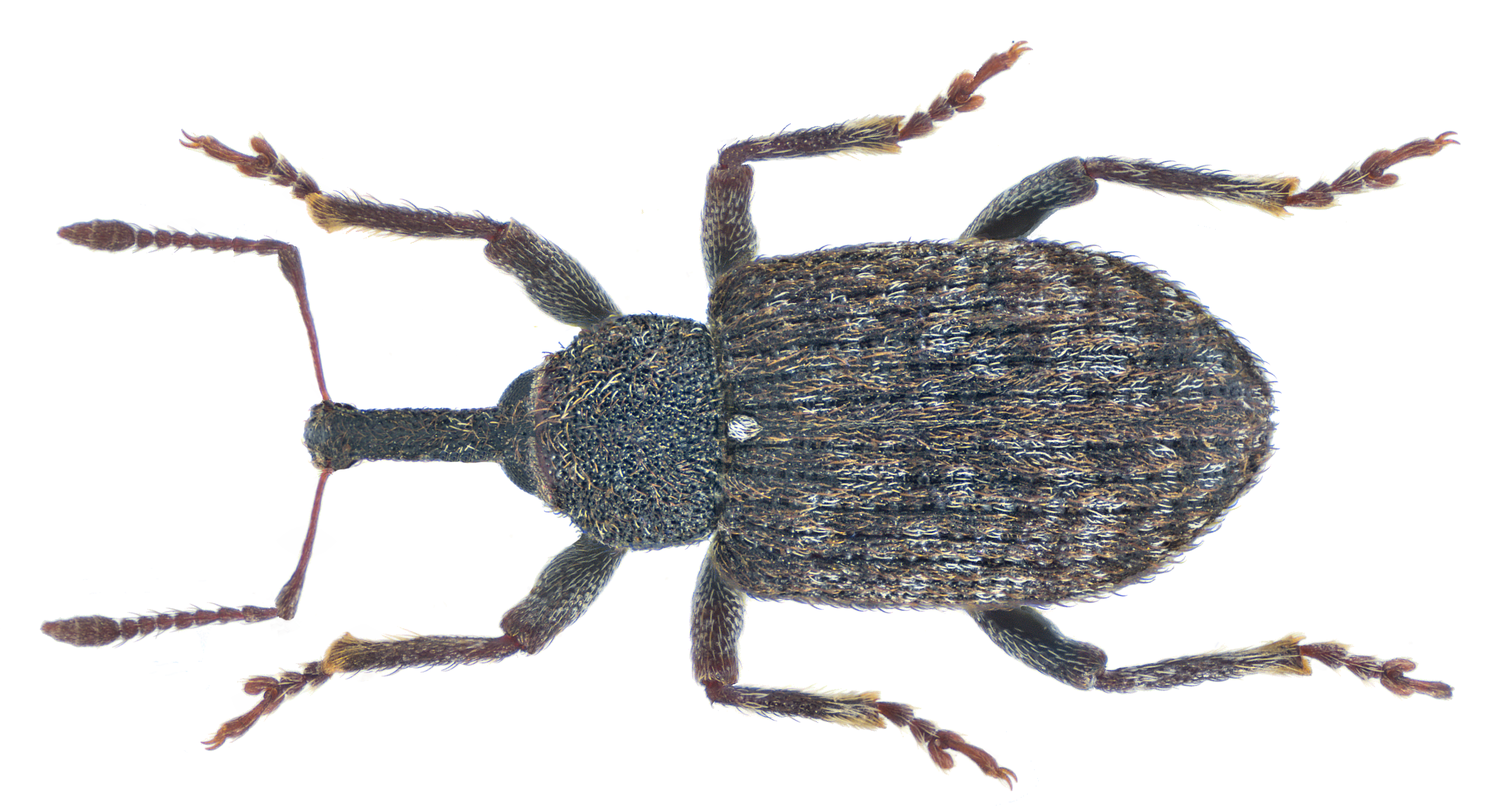

Scientific classification
- Domain: Eukaryota
- Kingdom: Animalia
- Phylum: Arthropoda
- Class: Insecta
- Order: Coleoptera
- Suborder: Polyphaga
- Infraorder: Cucujiformia
- Family: Brachyceridae
- Genus: Procas
- Species: P. granulicollis

Binomial name
- Procas granulicollis Walton, 1848

= Procas granulicollis =

Species of beetle

Procas granulicollis (sometimes known as the climbing corydalis weevil) is a beetle in the family Curculionidae, the true weevils. It was first described in 1848 from a specimen collected in Cumbria and has since been found at a number of other sites in Britain, mainly in the west. It was thought to be endemic to the island but is now also known to occur in Spain.

It is about 4-7mm long and black with white bristles giving it a mottled appearance. For many years it was considered to be a variant of the related species Procas armillatus which is very similar.

It is usually found in woodland clearings at sites where its only known foodplant climbing corydalis (Ceratocapnos claviculata) can be found. The larvae have not yet been discovered but may feed inside bracken stems.
