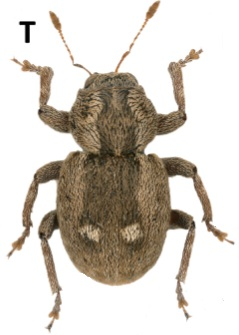

Scientific classification
- Kingdom: Animalia
- Phylum: Arthropoda
- Class: Insecta
- Order: Coleoptera
- Suborder: Polyphaga
- Infraorder: Cucujiformia
- Family: Brachyceridae
- Genus: Cryptolarynx
- Species: C. endroedyi

Binomial name
- Cryptolarynx endroedyi Haran, 2023

= Cryptolarynx endroedyi =

Species of beetle

Cryptolarynx endroedyi is a species of beetle of the family Curculionidae. It is found in South Africa, where it is only known from the Clanwilliam area in the Western Cape province.

== Description ==
Adults reach a length of about 3.6 mm and have an integument black body, with the antennae, tibiae and tarsi reddish.

== Biology ==
Specimens were collected in a flowering meadow.

== Etymology ==
This species is named in honour of Sebastian Endrödy-Younga, coleopterist at the Ditsong National Museum of Natural History.
