= Raymondionyminae =

Scientific classification
- Kingdom: Animalia
- Phylum: Arthropoda
- Class: Insecta
- Order: Coleoptera
- Suborder: Polyphaga
- Infraorder: Cucujiformia
- Family: Brachyceridae
- Subfamily: Raymondionyminae

Subfamily of beetles

Raymondionyminae is a subfamily of snout and bark beetles in the family Brachyceridae. There are at least three genera and two described species in Raymondionyminae.

== Genera ==
These three genera belong to the subfamily Raymondionyminae:

- Alaocybites Gilbert, 1956^{i c g b}
- Gilbertiola Osella, 1982^{i g b}
- Schizomicrus Casey, 1905^{i c g b}

Data sources: i = ITIS, c = Catalogue of Life, g = GBIF, b = Bugguide.net
