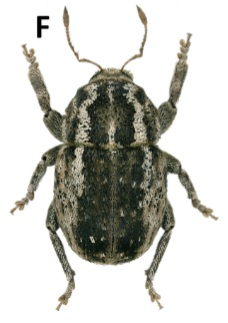

Scientific classification
- Kingdom: Animalia
- Phylum: Arthropoda
- Class: Insecta
- Order: Coleoptera
- Suborder: Polyphaga
- Infraorder: Cucujiformia
- Family: Brachyceridae
- Genus: Cryptolarynx
- Species: C. robustus

Binomial name
- Cryptolarynx robustus Haran, 2023

= Cryptolarynx robustus =

Species of beetle

Cryptolarynx robustus is a species of beetle of the family Curculionidae. It is found in South Africa, where it is only known from the type locality in the Western Cape province.

== Description ==
Adults reach a length of about 4.5–5 mm and have an integument black body, with the antennae, tarsi and sometimes tibiae reddish.

== Biology ==
Specimens were collected in September, at the bases of plants of Oxalis cf. purpureain patches of Renosterveld.

== Etymology ==
The species name is derived from the Latin adjective robustus and refers to the stocky appearance of the species.
