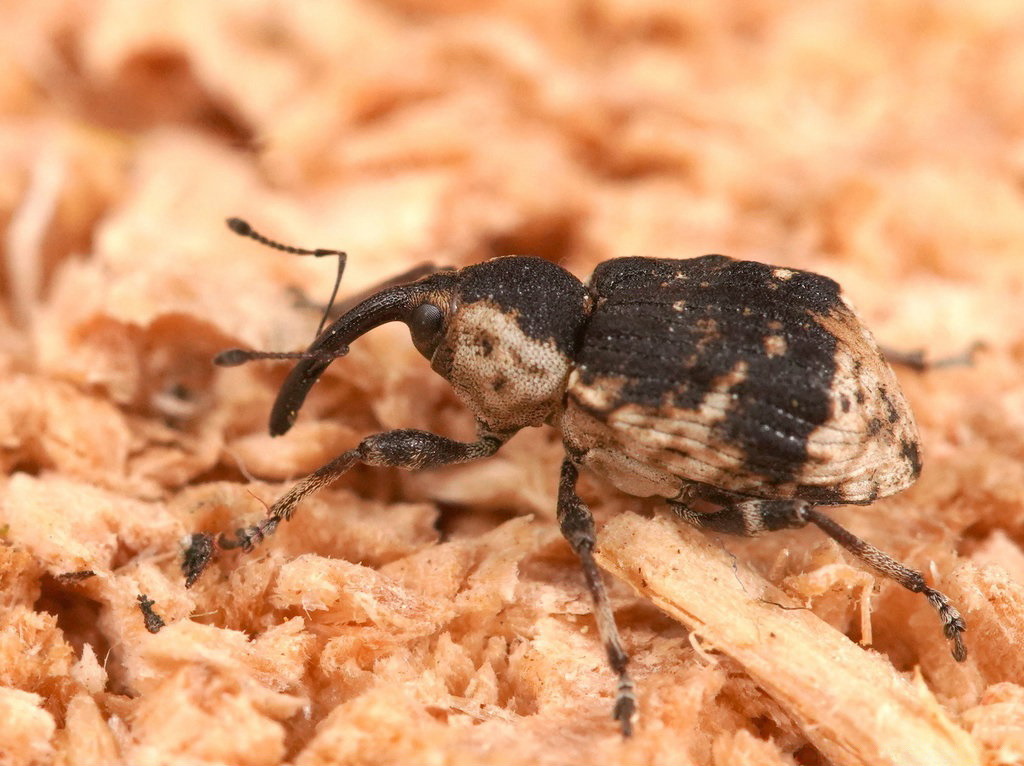

Scientific classification
- Domain: Eukaryota
- Kingdom: Animalia
- Phylum: Arthropoda
- Class: Insecta
- Order: Coleoptera
- Suborder: Polyphaga
- Infraorder: Cucujiformia
- Family: Brachyceridae
- Genus: Grypus
- Species: G. equiseti

Binomial name
- Grypus equiseti (Fabricius, 1775)

= Grypus equiseti =

Species of beetle

Grypus equiseti, known by the common name horsetail weevil, is a species of weevil native to Europe. It feeds on Equisetum arvense (field horsetail or common horsetail) and Equisetum palustre (marsh horsetail) plants. It has been introduced to New Zealand to control Equisetum arvense, which is an invasive species there.
