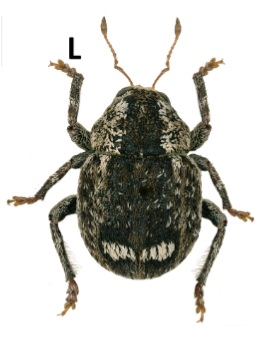

Scientific classification
- Kingdom: Animalia
- Phylum: Arthropoda
- Class: Insecta
- Order: Coleoptera
- Suborder: Polyphaga
- Infraorder: Cucujiformia
- Family: Brachyceridae
- Genus: Cryptolarynx
- Species: C. pilipes

Binomial name
- Cryptolarynx pilipes Haran, 2023

= Cryptolarynx pilipes =

Species of beetle

Cryptolarynx pilipes is a species of beetle of the family Curculionidae. It is found in South Africa, where it is only known from the type locality, Clanwilliam in the Western Cape province.

== Description ==
Adults reach a length of about 3.4–3.7 mm and have an integument black body, with the antennae and tarsi reddish.

== Biology ==
Specimens were collected in October from Arctotheca calendula.

== Etymology ==
This species name is derived from the Latin nouns pilus (meaning hair) and pes (meaning foot) and refers to the fringe of long setae on the metatibiae of the species.
