= Procas lecontei =

Scientific classification
- Kingdom: Animalia
- Phylum: Arthropoda
- Class: Insecta
- Order: Coleoptera
- Suborder: Polyphaga
- Infraorder: Cucujiformia
- Family: Brachyceridae
- Subfamily: Erirhininae
- Genus: Procas
- Species: P. lecontei

Binomial name
- Procas lecontei Bedel, 1879

Species of beetle

Procas lecontei is a species of marsh weevil in the beetle family Brachyceridae. It is found in North America.
