= Brachybamus electus =

Scientific classification
- Kingdom: Animalia
- Phylum: Arthropoda
- Class: Insecta
- Order: Coleoptera
- Suborder: Polyphaga
- Infraorder: Cucujiformia
- Family: Brachyceridae
- Subfamily: Erirhininae
- Genus: Brachybamus
- Species: B. electus

Binomial name
- Brachybamus electus Germar, 1835

Synonyms
- Brachybamus inceratus Boheman, 1843

Species of beetle

Brachybamus electus is a species of marsh weevil in the beetle family Brachyceridae.
