= Notaris puncticollis =

Scientific classification
- Kingdom: Animalia
- Phylum: Arthropoda
- Class: Insecta
- Order: Coleoptera
- Suborder: Polyphaga
- Infraorder: Cucujiformia
- Family: Brachyceridae
- Genus: Notaris
- Species: N. puncticollis

Binomial name
- Notaris puncticollis (LeConte, 1876)

Species of beetle

Notaris puncticollis is a species of marsh weevil in the beetle family Brachyceridae.

== Habitat ==
Notaris puncticollis mainly lives in wetlands. The range of this species is boreal transcontinental.
