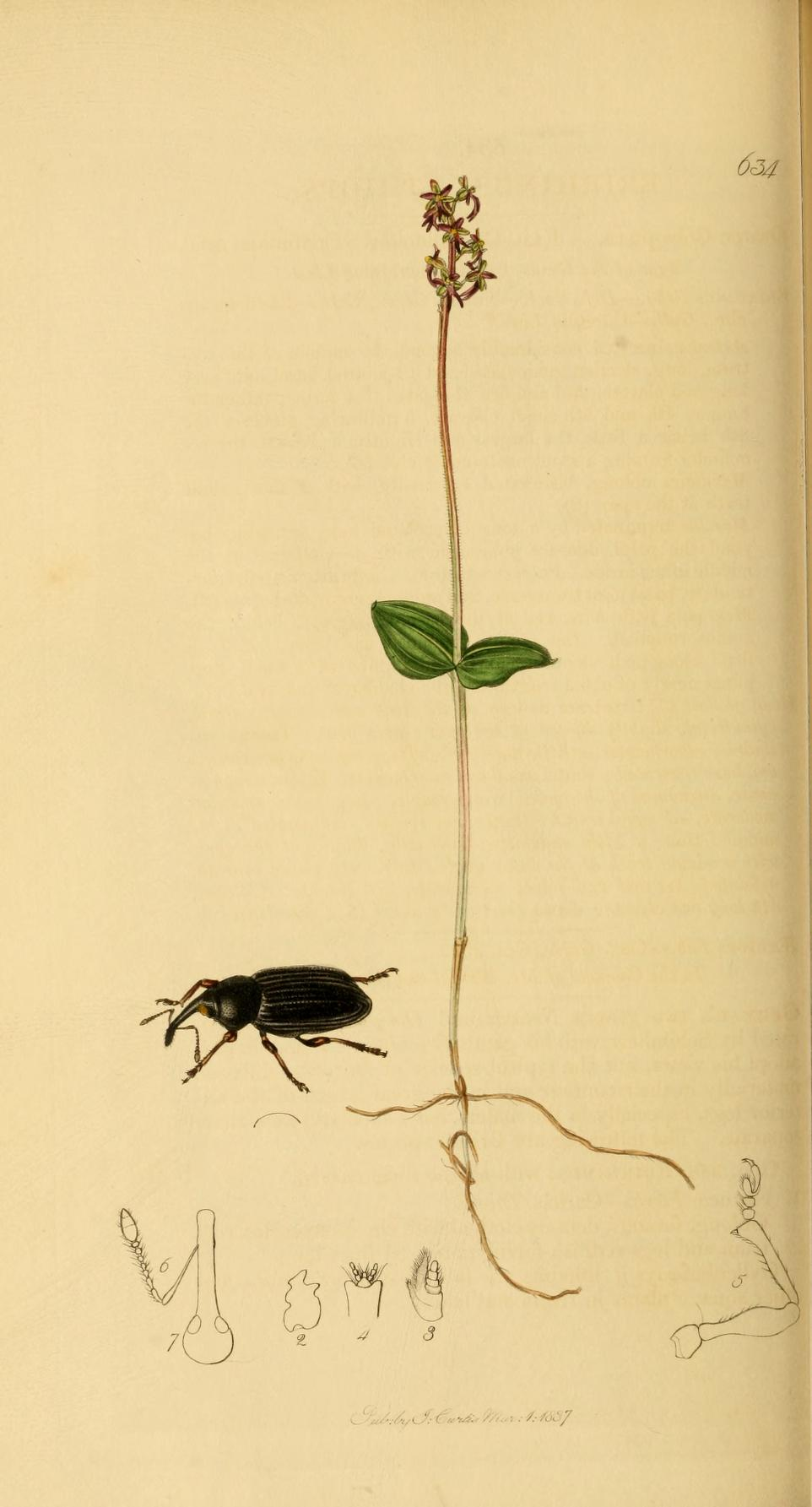

Scientific classification
- Kingdom: Animalia
- Phylum: Arthropoda
- Clade: Pancrustacea
- Class: Insecta
- Order: Coleoptera
- Suborder: Polyphaga
- Infraorder: Cucujiformia
- Superfamily: Curculionoidea
- Family: Brachyceridae
- Genus: Notaris
- Species: N. aethiops

Binomial name
- Notaris aethiops (Fabricius, 1792)

Synonyms
- Erirhinus morio Mannerheim, 1853

= Notaris aethiops =

Species of beetle

Notaris aethiops is a species of marsh weevil in the beetle family Brachyceridae.
