= Grypus leechi =

Scientific classification
- Domain: Eukaryota
- Kingdom: Animalia
- Phylum: Arthropoda
- Class: Insecta
- Order: Coleoptera
- Suborder: Polyphaga
- Infraorder: Cucujiformia
- Family: Brachyceridae
- Subfamily: Erirhininae
- Genus: Grypus
- Species: G. leechi

Binomial name
- Grypus leechi (Cawthra, 1957)

Species of beetle

Grypus leechi is a species of marsh weevil in the beetle family Brachyceridae.
