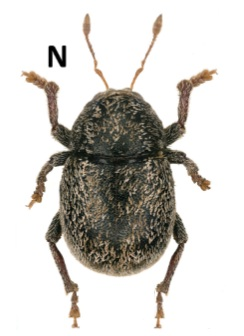

Scientific classification
- Kingdom: Animalia
- Phylum: Arthropoda
- Class: Insecta
- Order: Coleoptera
- Suborder: Polyphaga
- Infraorder: Cucujiformia
- Family: Brachyceridae
- Genus: Cryptolarynx
- Species: C. falciformis

Binomial name
- Cryptolarynx falciformis Haran, 2023

= Cryptolarynx falciformis =

Species of beetle

Cryptolarynx falciformis is a species of beetle of the family Curculionidae. It is found in South Africa, where it is only known from the type locality of Tulbagh in the Western Cape province.

== Description ==
Adults reach a length of about 3.2 mm and have an integument black body, with the antennae and tarsi reddish.

== Etymology ==
This species name refers to the falcate (sickle-shaped) copulatory sclerite in the endophallus of this species.
