= Hadrocryptolarynx =

Scientific classification
- Kingdom: Animalia
- Phylum: Arthropoda
- Class: Insecta
- Order: Coleoptera
- Suborder: Polyphaga
- Infraorder: Cucujiformia
- Family: Brachyceridae
- Tribe: Cryptolaryngini
- Genus: Hadrocryptolarynx; Van Schalkwyk, 1966

Genus of beetles

Hadrocryptolarynx is a genus of weevils in the family Curculionidae and the subfamily Brachycerinae.

== Species ==
- Hadrocryptolarynx major Haran, 2023
