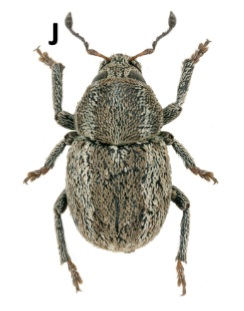

Scientific classification
- Kingdom: Animalia
- Phylum: Arthropoda
- Class: Insecta
- Order: Coleoptera
- Suborder: Polyphaga
- Infraorder: Cucujiformia
- Family: Brachyceridae
- Genus: Cryptolarynx
- Species: C. estriatus

Binomial name
- Cryptolarynx estriatus (Marshall, 1957)

Synonyms
- Cryptopharynx estriatus Marshall, 1957

= Cryptolarynx estriatus =

Species of beetle

Cryptolarynx estriatus is a species of beetle of the family Curculionidae. It is found in South Africa, where it occurs in the Nieuwoudtville area.

== Description ==
Adults reach a length of about 1.75–2.5 mm and have an integument black body, with the scapes and tarsi reddish.

== Biology ==
Specimens have been collected on the ground or feeding on vegetation, but no precise data of its host plants are known. A series of adults was found feeding on leaves of Moraea near Nieuwoudtville in 1995, and they also fed on this plant in captivity, but, in view of the wide use of Oxalis as larval host in Cryptolarynx, the larvae probably also develop in bulbs of an Oxalis species rather than on Moraea. Adults were collected in July, September and November.
