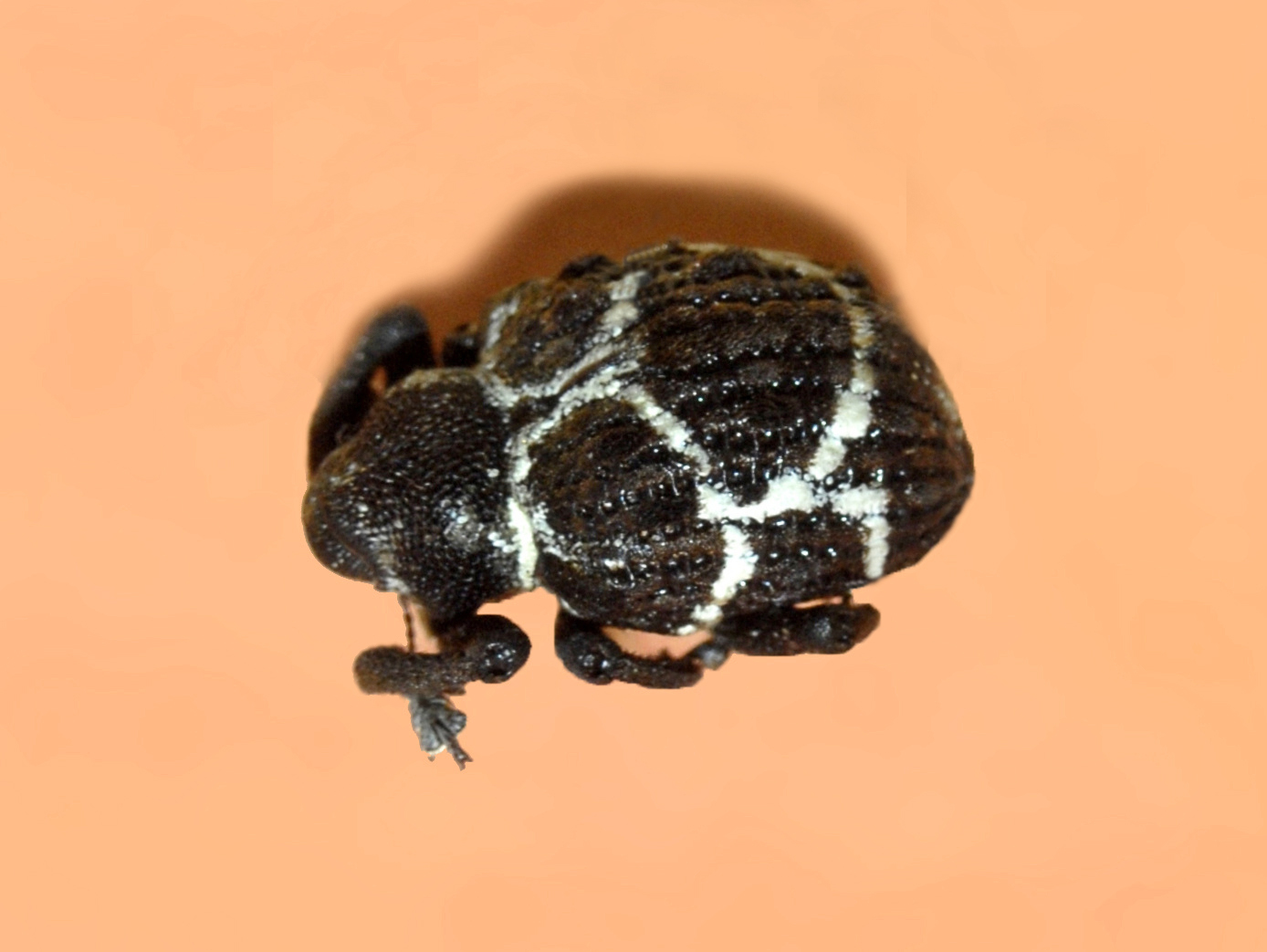
- Museum specimen of Desmidophorus cumingi

Scientific classification
- Kingdom: Animalia
- Phylum: Arthropoda
- Class: Insecta
- Order: Coleoptera
- Suborder: Polyphaga
- Infraorder: Cucujiformia
- Family: Brachyceridae
- Genus: Desmidophorus
- Species: D. cumingi

Binomial name
- Desmidophorus cumingi Bohem. in Schoenh., 1845

= Desmidophorus cumingi =

Species of beetle

Desmidophorus cumingi is a species of weevil in the family Brachyceridae. This beetle can reach a length of about 12 mm. It occurs in the Philippines.
