= Brachybamus =

Scientific classification
- Kingdom: Animalia
- Phylum: Arthropoda
- Class: Insecta
- Order: Coleoptera
- Suborder: Polyphaga
- Infraorder: Cucujiformia
- Family: Brachyceridae
- Subfamily: Erirhininae
- Genus: Brachybamus; Germar, 1835

Genus of beetles

Brachybamus is a genus of marsh weevils in the beetle family Brachyceridae. There are at least three described species in Brachybamus.

== Species ==
The following three species belong to the genus Brachybamus:

- Brachybamus electus Germar, 1835
- Brachybamus inceratus Boheman, 1843
- Brachybamus pipitzi Faust, 1888
