= Schizomicrus =

Scientific classification
- Kingdom: Animalia
- Phylum: Arthropoda
- Class: Insecta
- Order: Coleoptera
- Suborder: Polyphaga
- Infraorder: Cucujiformia
- Family: Brachyceridae
- Subfamily: Raymondionyminae
- Genus: Schizomicrus; Casey, 1905

Genus of beetles

Schizomicrus is a genus of snout and bark beetles in the family Brachyceridae. There is one described species in Schizomicrus, S. caecus.
