= Cryptolarynx =

Scientific classification
- Kingdom: Animalia
- Phylum: Arthropoda
- Class: Insecta
- Order: Coleoptera
- Suborder: Polyphaga
- Infraorder: Cucujiformia
- Family: Brachyceridae
- Tribe: Cryptolaryngini
- Genus: Cryptolarynx; Van Schalkwyk, 1966

Genus of beetles

Cryptolarynx is a genus of weevils in the family Curculionidae and the subfamily Brachycerinae.

== Species ==
- Cryptolarynx armatus Haran, 2023
- Cryptolarynx carinatus Haran, 2023
- Cryptolarynx cederbergensis Haran, 2023
- Cryptolarynx endroedyi Haran, 2023
- Cryptolarynx estriatus (Marshall, 1957)
- Cryptolarynx falciformis Haran, 2023
- Cryptolarynx hirtulus Haran, 2023
- Cryptolarynx homaroides Haran, 2023
- Cryptolarynx luteipennis Haran, 2023
- Cryptolarynx marshalli Haran, 2023
- Cryptolarynx muellerae Haran, 2023
- Cryptolarynx namaquanus Haran, 2023
- Cryptolarynx oberlanderi Haran, 2023
- Cryptolarynx oberprieleri Haran, 2023
- Cryptolarynx pilipes Haran, 2023
- Cryptolarynx pyrophilus Haran, 2023
- Cryptolarynx robustus Haran, 2023
- Cryptolarynx san Haran, 2023
- Cryptolarynx spinicornis Haran, 2023
- Cryptolarynx squamulatus Haran, 2023
- Cryptolarynx subglaber Haran, 2023
- Cryptolarynx variabilis Haran, 2023
- Cryptolarynx vitis (Marshall, 1957)
