= Onychylis =

Scientific classification
- Kingdom: Animalia
- Phylum: Arthropoda
- Class: Insecta
- Order: Coleoptera
- Suborder: Polyphaga
- Infraorder: Cucujiformia
- Family: Brachyceridae
- Subfamily: Erirhininae
- Genus: Onychylis; LeConte, 1876

Genus of beetles

Onychylis is a genus of marsh weevils in the beetle family Brachyceridae. There are about 12 described species in Onychylis.

== Species ==
These 12 species belong to the genus Onychylis:

- Onychylis alternans LeConte, 1876
- Onychylis argentinensis Wibmer & O'Brien, 1986
- Onychylis cretatus Champion, 1902
- Onychylis essigi Tanner, 1954
- Onychylis filicornis Wibmer & O'Brien, 1986
- Onychylis longulus LeConte, 1876
- Onychylis meridionalis Champion, 1902
- Onychylis nigrirostris (Boheman, 1843) (pickerelweed weevil)
- Onychylis parvulus Burke, 1961
- Onychylis setiger Champion, 1902
- Onychylis texanus Burke, 1959
- Onychylis vulgatus Wibmer & O'Brien, 1986
