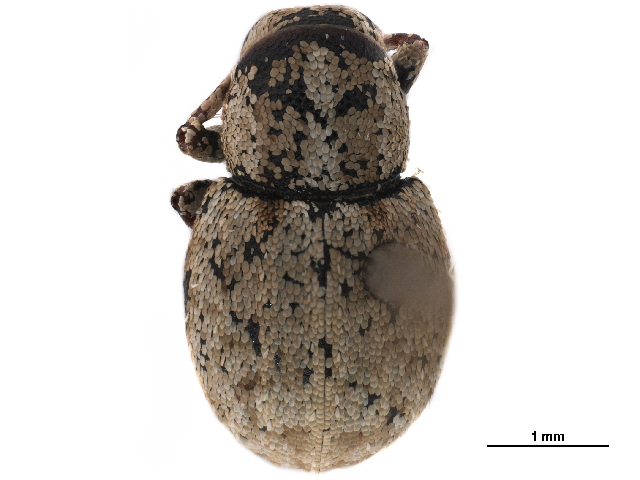
- Perieges bardus

Scientific classification
- Kingdom: Animalia
- Phylum: Arthropoda
- Clade: Pancrustacea
- Class: Insecta
- Order: Coleoptera
- Suborder: Polyphaga
- Infraorder: Cucujiformia
- Superfamily: Curculionoidea
- Family: Brachyceridae
- Subfamily: Brachycerinae
- Tribe: Cryptolaryngini; Van Schalkwyk, 1966

Genera
- See text

Synonyms
- Periegini Legalov, 2003

= Cryptolaryngini =

Tribe of beetles

Cryptolaryngini is a weevil tribe in the subfamily Brachycerinae.

== Genera ==
- Cryptolarynx Van Schalkwyk, 1966
- Hadrocryptolarynx Haran, 2023
- Perieges Schönherr, 1842
