= Lissorhoptrus =

Scientific classification
- Kingdom: Animalia
- Phylum: Arthropoda
- Class: Insecta
- Order: Coleoptera
- Suborder: Polyphaga
- Infraorder: Cucujiformia
- Family: Brachyceridae
- Subfamily: Erirhininae
- Tribe: Stenopelmini
- Genus: Lissorhoptrus; LeConte, 1876

Genus of beetles

Lissorhoptrus is a genus of rice water weevils in the family of beetles known as Erirhinidae. There are at least 20 described species in Lissorhoptrus.

== Species ==
These 25 species belong to the genus Lissorhoptrus:

- Lissorhoptrus bosqi Kuschel, 1944^{c}
- Lissorhoptrus brevirostris Kuschel, 1951^{c}
- Lissorhoptrus buchanani Kuschel, 1952^{i c}
- Lissorhoptrus carinirostris Kuschel, 1951^{c}
- Lissorhoptrus chapini Kuschel, 1952^{i c}
- Lissorhoptrus erratilis Kuschel, 1951^{c}
- Lissorhoptrus foveolatus Duval, 1946^{c}
- Lissorhoptrus gracilipes Kuschel, 1951^{c}
- Lissorhoptrus insularis Kuschel, 1951^{c g}
- Lissorhoptrus isthmicus Kuschel, 1951^{c}
- Lissorhoptrus kuscheli O'Brien, 1996^{c}
- Lissorhoptrus lacustris Kuschel, 1952^{i c b}
- Lissorhoptrus lepidus Kuschel, 1951^{c}
- Lissorhoptrus longipennis Kuschel, 1952^{i c}
- Lissorhoptrus longitarsis Kuschel, 1951^{c g}
- Lissorhoptrus mexicanus Kuschel, 1951^{c}
- Lissorhoptrus oryzae Costa Lima, 1936^{c}
- Lissorhoptrus oryzophilus Kuschel, 1952^{i c b} (rice water weevil)
- Lissorhoptrus panamensis Kuschel, 1951^{c}
- Lissorhoptrus paraguayanus Kuschel, 1956^{c}
- Lissorhoptrus persimilis O'Brien, 1996^{c}
- Lissorhoptrus pseudoryzophilus Guan, Huang & Lu, 1995^{c}
- Lissorhoptrus robbinsorum O'Brien, 2014^{c g}
- Lissorhoptrus simplex (Say, 1831)^{i c}
- Lissorhoptrus venezolanus Kuschel, 1956^{c}

Data sources: i = ITIS, c = Catalogue of Life, g = GBIF, b = Bugguide.net
