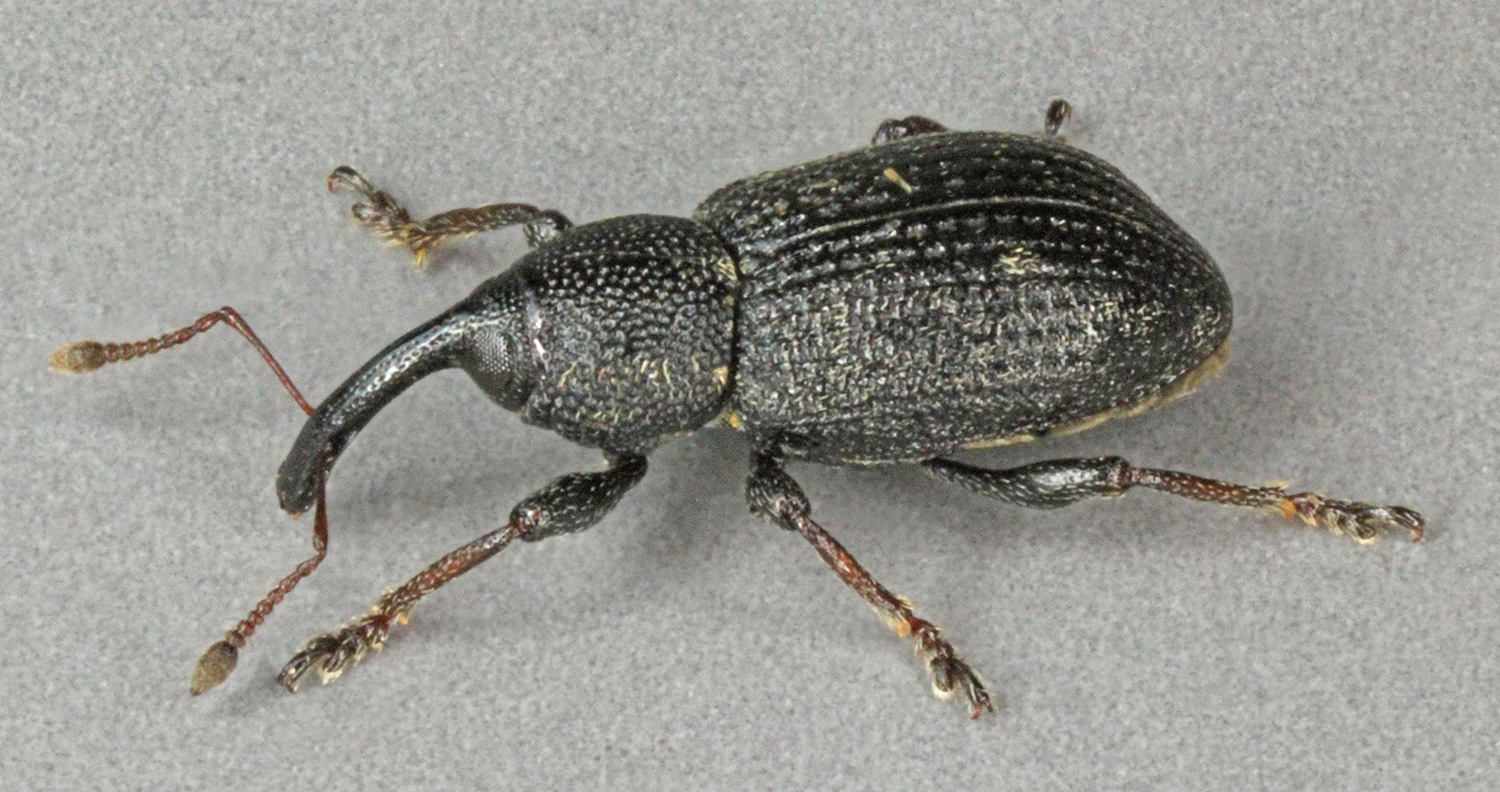
- Notaris acridulus

Scientific classification
- Domain: Eukaryota
- Kingdom: Animalia
- Phylum: Arthropoda
- Class: Insecta
- Order: Coleoptera
- Suborder: Polyphaga
- Infraorder: Cucujiformia
- Family: Brachyceridae
- Subfamily: Erirhininae
- Genus: Notaris; Germar, 1817

= Notaris (beetle) =

Genus of beetles

Notaris is a genus of marsh weevils in the family of beetles known as Brachyceridae. There are at least 40 described species in Notaris.

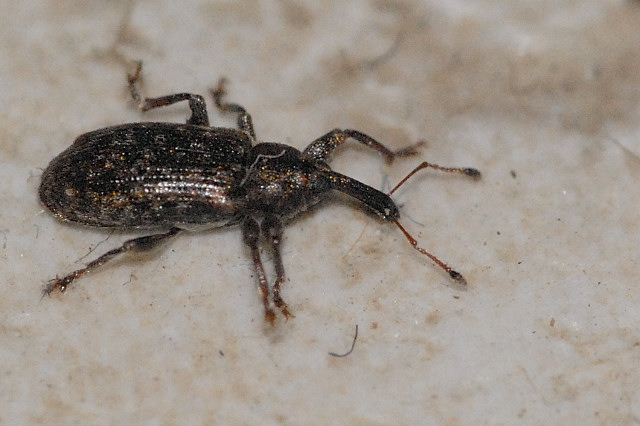
Notaris scirpi

== Species ==
These 40 species belong to the genus Notaris:

- Notaris acridulus (Linnaeus, C., 1758)^{c g}
- Notaris aethiops (Fabricius, 1792)^{i c b}
- Notaris alpinus Helfer,^{c}
- Notaris aterrima (Hampe, 1850)^{g}
- Notaris bimaculatus (Fabricius, 1787)^{i c}
- Notaris cordicollis Stierl., 1893-1894^{c}
- Notaris dalmatinus Stierlin, 1892^{c}
- Notaris dauricus Faust, 1882^{c}
- Notaris discretus Faust, 1882^{c}
- Notaris distans Faust, 1890^{c}
- Notaris dorsalis Germar, 1817^{c}
- Notaris eversmanni Faust, 1882^{c}
- Notaris festucae Billberg, 1820^{c}
- Notaris flavipilosus Chittenden, 1930^{i c}
- Notaris frivaldszkyi Tournier, 1874^{c}
- Notaris funebris Kono, 1930^{c}
- Notaris gerhardti Letzner, 1872^{c}
- Notaris goliath Buchanan, 1927^{i c}
- Notaris granulipennis Tournier, 1874^{c}
- Notaris illibatus Faust, 1882^{c}
- Notaris imprudens Faust, 1885^{c}
- Notaris indigena Billberg, 1820^{c}
- Notaris insularis Faust, 1882^{c}
- Notaris lapponicus Faust, 1882^{c}
- Notaris lederi Faust, 1882^{c}
- Notaris mandschuricus Voss, 1940^{c}
- Notaris montanus Faust, 1882^{c}
- Notaris nereis Billberg, 1820^{c}
- Notaris nivalis Faust, 1882^{c}
- Notaris oberti Faust, 1885^{c}
- Notaris ochoticus Korotyaev, 1984^{c}
- Notaris okunii Kono, 1930^{c}
- Notaris petax Faust, 1882^{c}
- Notaris puncticollis (LeConte, 1876)^{i b}
- Notaris punctum Billberg, 1820^{c}
- Notaris rotundicollis Motschulsky, 1860^{c}
- Notaris salarius Schneider, 1898^{c}
- Notaris scirpi (Fabricius, J.C., 1792)^{c g}
- Notaris subcostatus Kono, 1930^{c}
- Notaris wyomiensis Chittendon, 1906^{c}

Data sources: i = ITIS, c = Catalogue of Life, g = GBIF, b = Bugguide.net
