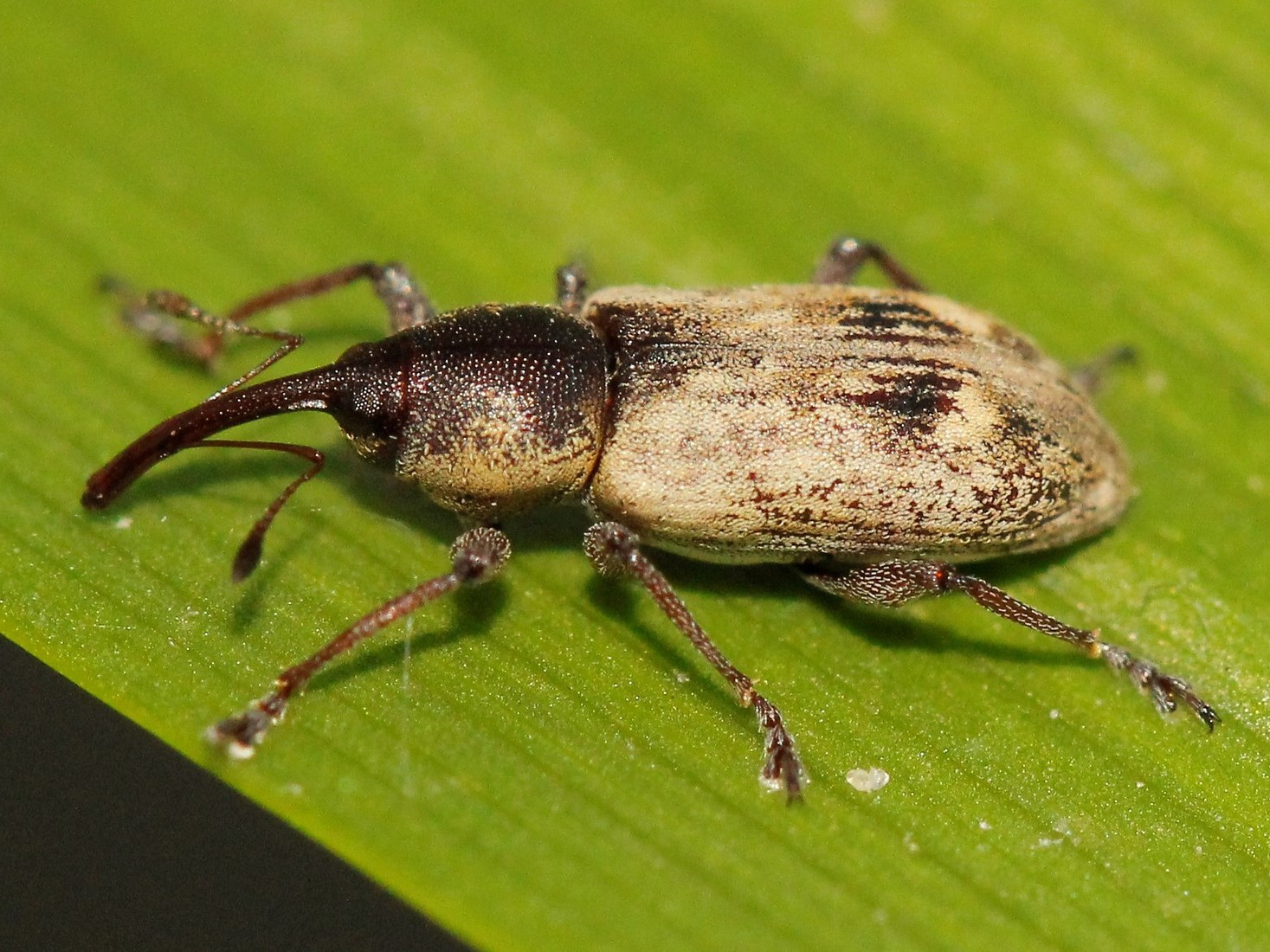
- Thryogenes festucae

Scientific classification
- Kingdom: Animalia
- Phylum: Arthropoda
- Class: Insecta
- Order: Coleoptera
- Suborder: Polyphaga
- Infraorder: Cucujiformia
- Family: Brachyceridae
- Genus: Thryogenes; Bedel, 1884

Synonyms
- Erirhinus Stephens, 1829

= Thryogenes =

Genus of beetles

Thryogenes is a genus of beetles in the family Brachyceridae.

The species of this genus are found in Europe.

== Species ==
The following species are recognised in the genus Thryogenes:

- Thryogenes atrirostris Lohse, 1992
- Thryogenes festucae (J.F.W.Herbst, 1795)
- Thryogenes fiorii Zumpt, 1928
- Thryogenes nereis (Paykull & G.de, 1800)
- Thryogenes scirrhosus (Gyllenhal, 1836)
- Thryogenes ussuriensis Egorov, 1979
- BOLD:ACZ1356 (Thryogenes sp.)
