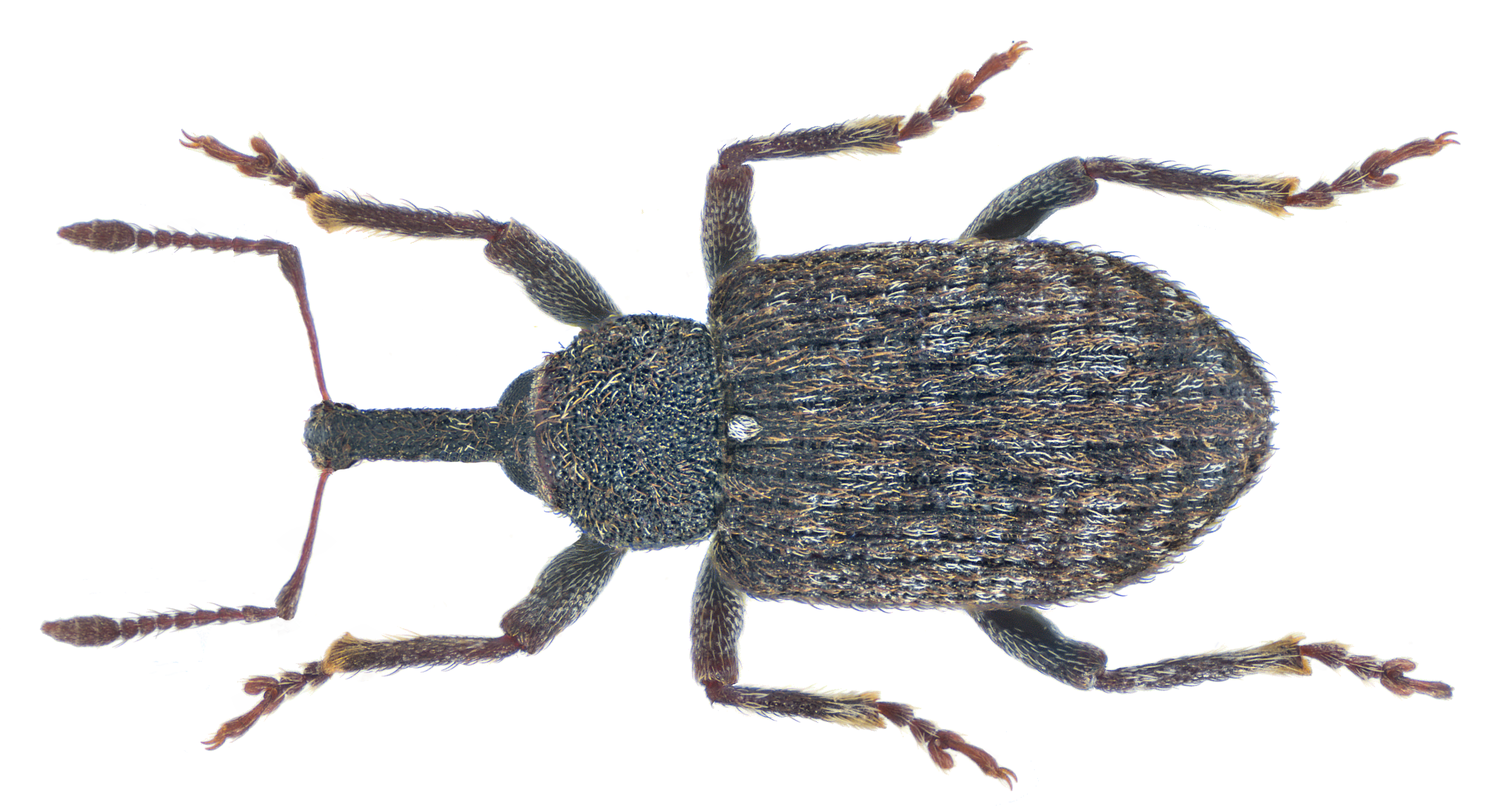
- Procas granulicollis

Scientific classification
- Domain: Eukaryota
- Kingdom: Animalia
- Phylum: Arthropoda
- Class: Insecta
- Order: Coleoptera
- Suborder: Polyphaga
- Infraorder: Cucujiformia
- Family: Brachyceridae
- Subfamily: Erirhininae
- Genus: Procas; Stephens, 1831

= Procas (beetle) =

Genus of beetles

Procas is a genus of marsh weevils in the family of beetles known as Brachyceridae. There are at least 20 described species in Procas.

== Species ==
These 28 species belong to the genus Procas:

- Procas alepensis Pic, 1915^{c}
- Procas alternans Klima, 1934^{c}
- Procas antoinei Klima, 1934^{c}
- Procas antoniei Klima, 1934^{c}
- Procas biguttatus Faust, 1882^{c}
- Procas bruleriei Klima, 1934^{c}
- Procas cottyi Perris, 1864^{c}
- Procas fastidiosus Pic, 1904^{c}
- Procas granulicollis Walton, 1848^{c}
- Procas lecontei Bedel, 1879^{i g b}
- Procas lethierryi Chevrolat, 1860^{c}
- Procas levantinus Thompson, 2006^{c}
- Procas maculatus Klima, 1934^{c}
- Procas michaelis Thompson, 2006^{c}
- Procas milleri Pic, M., 1901^{c g}
- Procas minutus Desbrochers, 1893^{c}
- Procas picipes Stephens, 1831^{c}
- Procas putoni Tournier, 1874^{c}
- Procas pyrrhodactylus Stephens, 1831^{c}
- Procas rasus Desbrochers, 1897^{c}
- Procas rufescens Klima, 1934^{c}
- Procas saulcyi Reiche & Saulcy, 1857^{c}
- Procas semihispidus Pic, M., 1901^{c g}
- Procas sibiricus Pic, 1904^{c}
- Procas siccensis Normand, 1951^{c}
- Procas steveni Schoenherr, 1842^{c}
- Procas testaceus Bajtenov, 1974^{c}
- Procas verberatus Scudder, 1893^{c}

Data sources: i = ITIS, c = Catalogue of Life, g = GBIF, b = Bugguide.net
