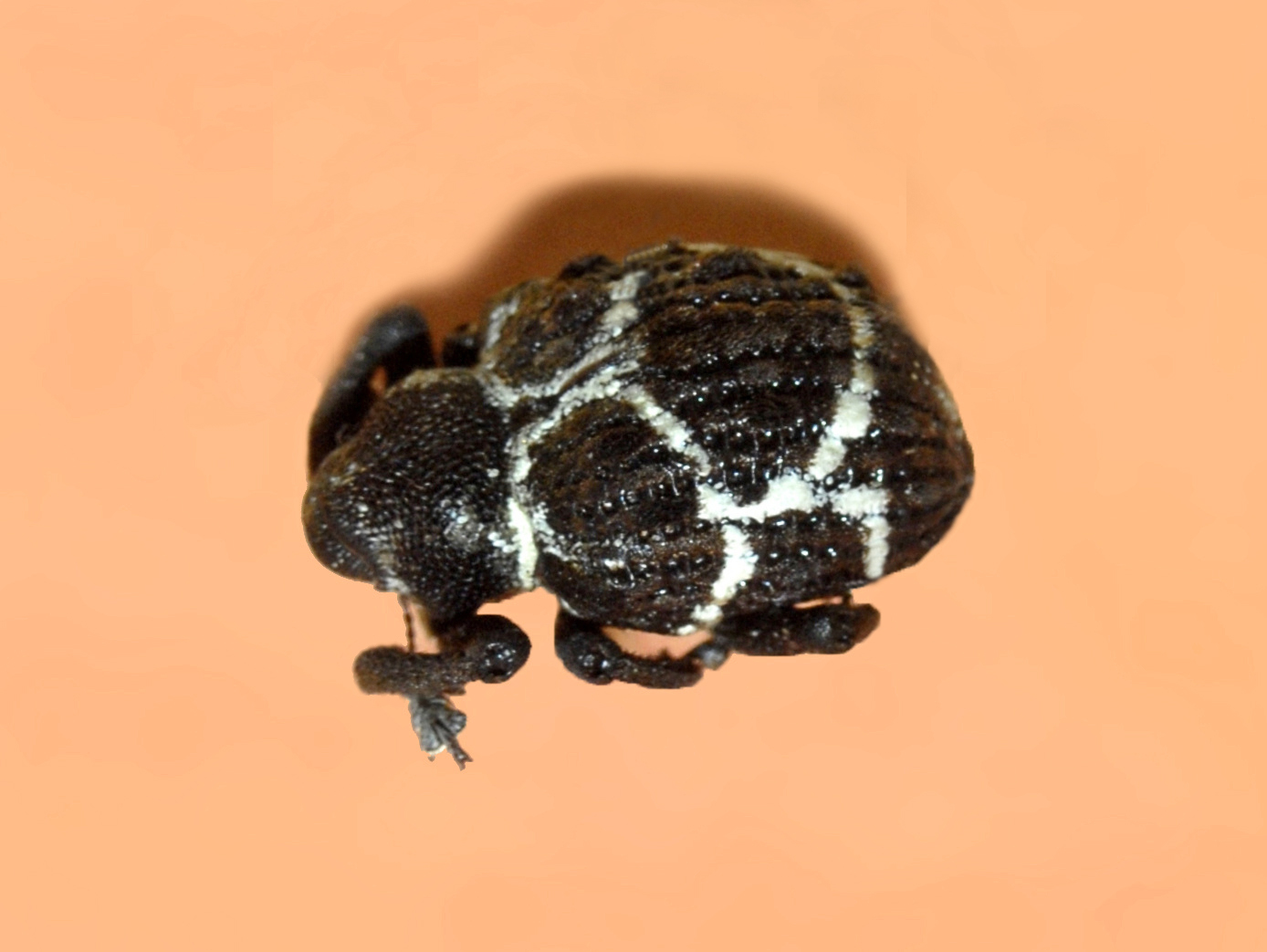
- Museum specimen of Desmidophorus cumingi

Scientific classification
- Kingdom: Animalia
- Phylum: Arthropoda
- Class: Insecta
- Order: Coleoptera
- Suborder: Polyphaga
- Infraorder: Cucujiformia
- Family: Brachyceridae
- Subfamily: Brachycerinae
- Tribe: Desmidophorini; Morimoto, 1962
- Genus: Desmidophorus; Dejean, 1835

Species
- See text

Synonyms
- Botrobatys Chevrolat, 1842; Botrobatys Dejean, 1836; Desmidophorinus Hustache, 1925; Trichosomus Chevrolat, 1881; Trichosomus Gemminger & Harold, 1871

= Desmidophorus =

Genus of beetles

Desmidophorus is a genus of weevils in the family Brachyceridae.

== Species ==
The genus includes the following species:

- Desmidophorus aeneobarbus
- Desmidophorus aequalis
- Desmidophorus alboniger
- Desmidophorus anxius
- Desmidophorus apicatus
- Desmidophorus areolatus
- Desmidophorus aterrimus
- Desmidophorus aureolus
- Desmidophorus bickhardti
- Desmidophorus brachmanum
- Desmidophorus breviusculus
- Desmidophorus brunneopilosus
- Desmidophorus caelatus
- Desmidophorus centralis
- Desmidophorus cineritius
- Desmidophorus communicans
- Desmidophorus confucii
- Desmidophorus crassus
- Desmidophorus cumingi
- Desmidophorus descarpentriesi
- Desmidophorus diffusus
- Desmidophorus discriminans
- Desmidophorus dohrni
- Desmidophorus dorsatus
- Desmidophorus duodecimfasciculatus
- Desmidophorus elongatus
- Desmidophorus encaustus
- Desmidophorus excellens
- Desmidophorus fasciatus
- Desmidophorus fasciculaticollis
- Desmidophorus fasciculicollis
- Desmidophorus fausti
- Desmidophorus floccosus
- Desmidophorus fulvidus
- Desmidophorus fulvopilosus
- Desmidophorus funebris
- Desmidophorus galericulus
- Desmidophorus granulipennis
- Desmidophorus griseipes
- Desmidophorus grisescens
- Desmidophorus hartmannianus
- Desmidophorus hebes
- Desmidophorus helleri
- Desmidophorus hovanus
- Desmidophorus hubenthali
- Desmidophorus imhoffi
- Desmidophorus imhoffii
- Desmidophorus inexpertus
- Desmidophorus infernalis
- Desmidophorus kolbei
- Desmidophorus lacordairei
- Desmidophorus lanosus
- Desmidophorus luteipes
- Desmidophorus luteovestis
- Desmidophorus maculatus
- Desmidophorus maculicollis
- Desmidophorus morphosus
- Desmidophorus nobilis
- Desmidophorus obliquefasciatus
- Desmidophorus obtusatus
- Desmidophorus omissus
- Desmidophorus penicillatus
- Desmidophorus pictipennis
- Desmidophorus planidorsum
- Desmidophorus praetor
- Desmidophorus praeustus
- Desmidophorus probus
- Desmidophorus propinquus
- Desmidophorus pustulosus
- Desmidophorus rousiographus
- Desmidophorus rufovellus
- Desmidophorus saravacanus
- Desmidophorus satanas
- Desmidophorus schenklingi
- Desmidophorus senex
- Desmidophorus similis
- Desmidophorus strenuus
- Desmidophorus suavis
- Desmidophorus szetschuanus
- Desmidophorus transversalis
- Desmidophorus ursus
- Desmidophorus viduus
- Desmidophorus vinosus
