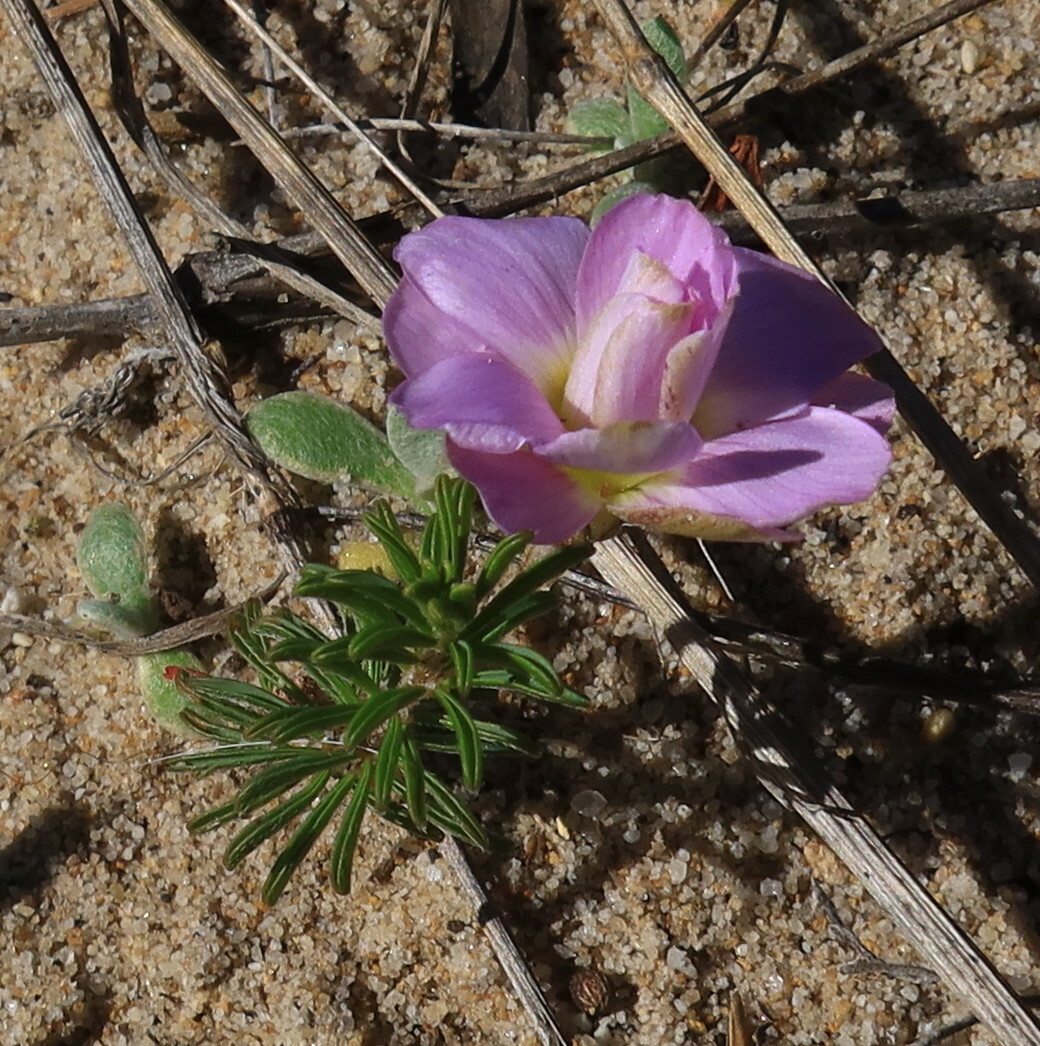

Scientific classification
- Kingdom: Plantae
- Clade: Tracheophytes
- Clade: Angiosperms
- Clade: Eudicots
- Clade: Rosids
- Order: Oxalidales
- Family: Oxalidaceae
- Genus: Oxalis
- Species: O. hirta

Binomial name
- Oxalis hirta L. (1753)

Synonyms
- Acetosella hirta (L.) Kuntze (1891)

= Oxalis hirta =

Species of plant

Oxalis hirta, the tropical woodsorrel, is a species of flowering plant in the genus Oxalis. It is endemic to the southwestern Cape Provinces of South Africa.
