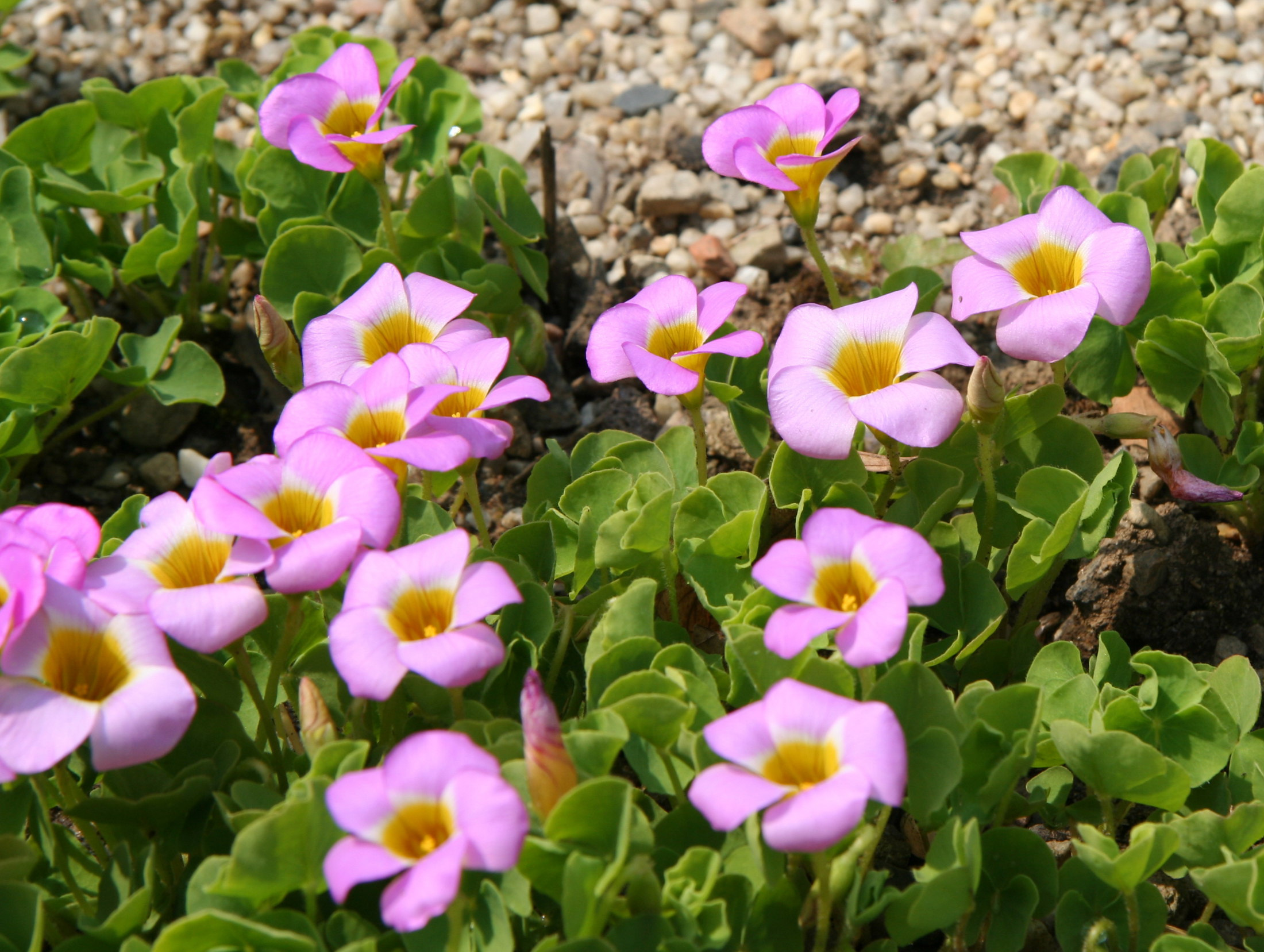

Scientific classification
- Kingdom: Plantae
- Clade: Tracheophytes
- Clade: Angiosperms
- Clade: Eudicots
- Clade: Rosids
- Order: Oxalidales
- Family: Oxalidaceae
- Genus: Oxalis
- Species: O. depressa

Binomial name
- Oxalis depressa Eckl. & Zeyh.

Synonyms
- Oxalis commutata var. pusilla R. Knuth; Oxalis convexula var. dilatata Eckl. & Zeyh. Oxalis dammeriana Schltr. Oxalis otaviensis R. Knuth

= Oxalis depressa =

Species of flowering plant

Oxalis depressa is an Oxalis species found in South Africa. It was first described in 1834.
