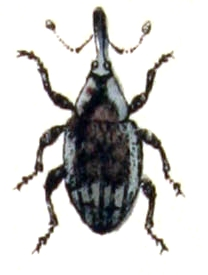
- Grypus equiseti

Scientific classification
- Kingdom: Animalia
- Phylum: Arthropoda
- Class: Insecta
- Order: Coleoptera
- Suborder: Polyphaga
- Infraorder: Cucujiformia
- Family: Brachyceridae
- Subfamily: Erirhininae
- Genus: Grypus; Germar, 1817

= Grypus =

Genus of beetles

Grypus is a genus of marsh weevils in the beetle family Brachyceridae. There are about 10 described species in Grypus.

== Species ==
These 10 species belong to the genus Grypus:

- Grypus atricornis Everts, 1922
- Grypus brassicae Billberg, 1820
- Grypus brunnirostris (Fabricius, 1792)
- Grypus distinctus Dejean, 1836
- Grypus equiseti (Fabricius, 1775)
- Grypus kaschmirensis Voss, 1960
- Grypus leechi (Cawthra, 1957)
- Grypus mannerheimi Faust, 1881
- Grypus rugicollis Voss, 1934
- Grypus vittatus Cooper, 1865
