= Gilbertiola =

Scientific classification
- Domain: Eukaryota
- Kingdom: Animalia
- Phylum: Arthropoda
- Class: Insecta
- Order: Coleoptera
- Suborder: Polyphaga
- Infraorder: Cucujiformia
- Family: Brachyceridae
- Subfamily: Raymondionyminae
- Genus: Gilbertiola; Osella, 1982

Genus of beetles

Gilbertiola is a genus of snout and bark beetles in the family Brachyceridae. There are at least two described species in Gilbertiola.

== Species ==
These two species belong to the genus Gilbertiola:

- Gilbertiola helferi (Gilbert, 1956)
- Gilbertiola schusteri (Gilbert, 1956)
