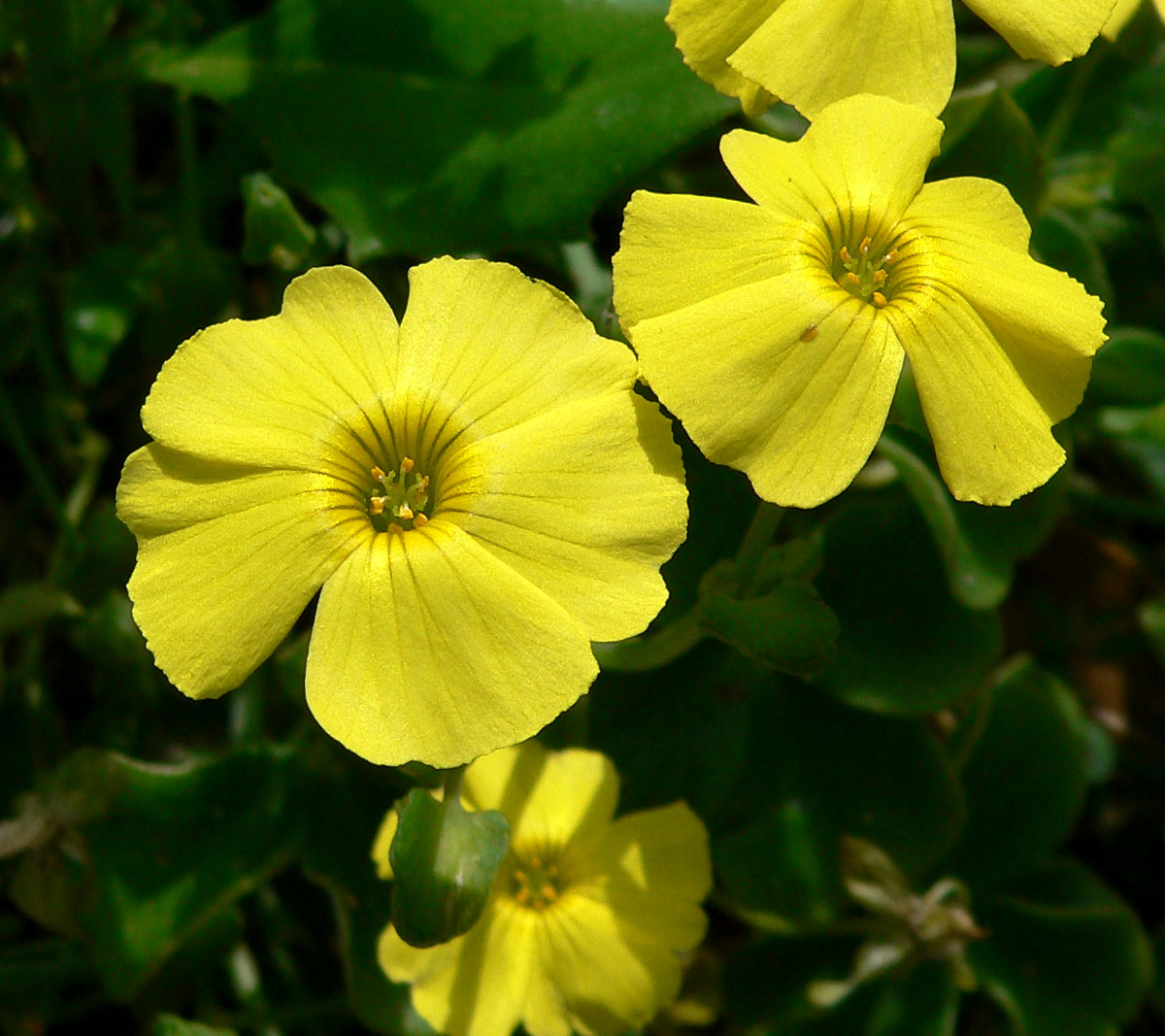

Scientific classification
- Kingdom: Plantae
- Clade: Tracheophytes
- Clade: Angiosperms
- Clade: Eudicots
- Clade: Rosids
- Order: Oxalidales
- Family: Oxalidaceae
- Genus: Oxalis
- Species: O. luteola

Binomial name
- Oxalis luteola Jacq.

Synonyms
- Oxalis balsamifera E. Mey. ex Sond.

= Oxalis luteola =

Species of flowering plant

Oxalis luteola is an Oxalis species found in South Africa. It was first described in 1794.

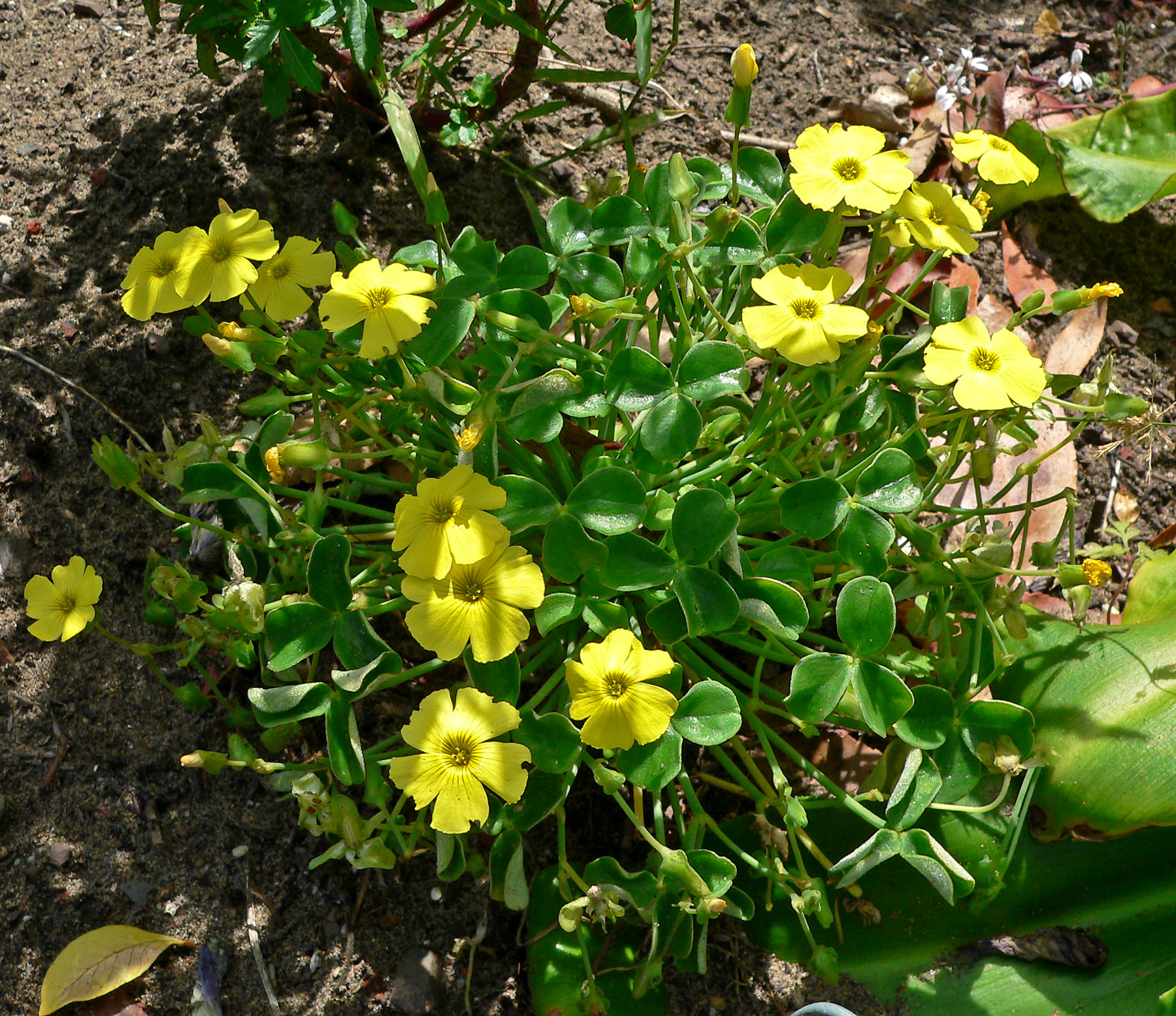
Oxalis luteola plant
