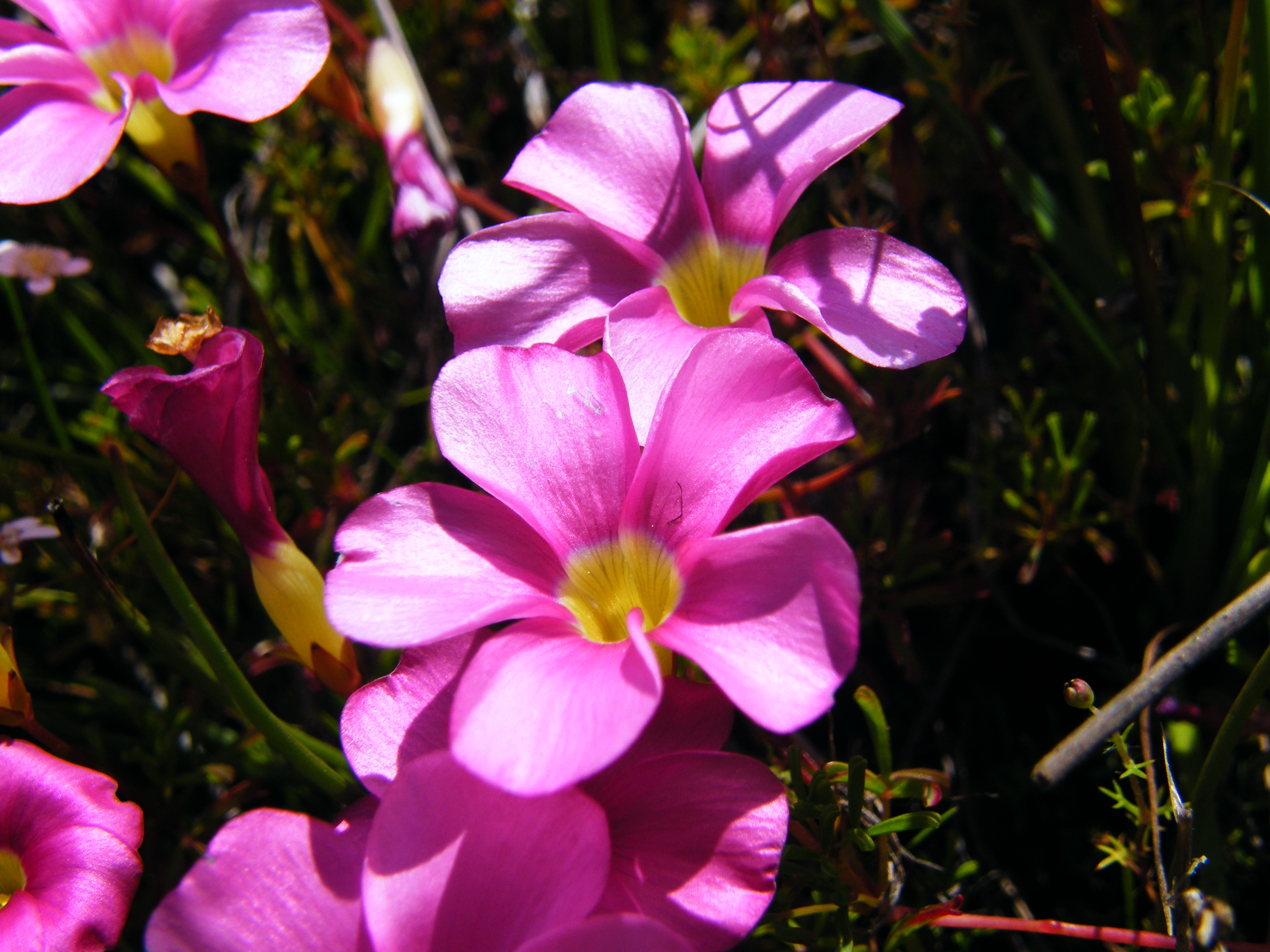
- Oxalis glabra flower

Scientific classification
- Kingdom: Plantae
- Clade: Tracheophytes
- Clade: Angiosperms
- Clade: Eudicots
- Clade: Rosids
- Order: Oxalidales
- Family: Oxalidaceae
- Genus: Oxalis
- Species: O. glabra

Binomial name
- Oxalis glabra Thunb.

= Oxalis glabra =

Species of flowering plant

Oxalis glabra is a member of the wood-sorrel family, Oxalidaceae. It is only one of the 800 total species belonging to this family. The plant is commonly known as finger-leaf due to its trifoliate leaf structure. This trifoliate structure can be seen in variations throughout all members of the genus Oxalis. However, the particularly narrow leaflets of the glabra plant look more like fingers rather than a common clover. The plant is native to South Africa and can be found carpeting the ground of woodlands and bushlands.

== Structure ==
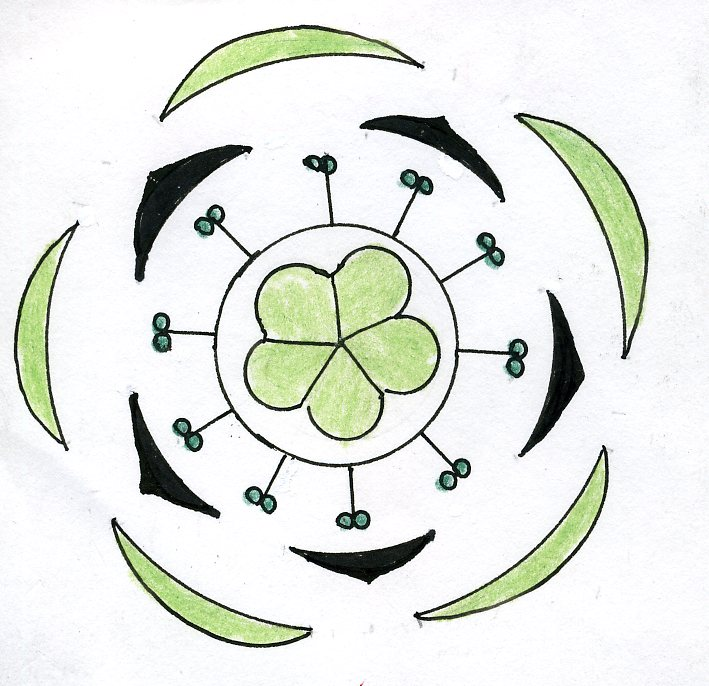
Floral diagram of 5-parted oxalis

The entire plant height measures at 15 cm high and spreads out in a low to the ground dense leafy covering, much like a carpet. The flowers are complete and 5 parted, showing actinomorphic symmetry. From the receptacle, 5 sharp lanceolate sepals emerge, unfused, surrounding the corolla. Each petal emerges in a spiral like fashion, initially wrapping around one another, but eventually opening up at full bloom. The petals are claw shaped, forming a narrow elongated yellow throat that opens up into a wide violet, white or pink lamina. The next whorl contains a ring of 10 stamens, followed by a whorl of 5 stigma, this is consistent with other species of the genus. Flowers are terminal and with a solitary inflorescence attached to an unbranched stem. If fertilized, the flower yields a narrow fruit capsule from its superior ovary.

== Distribution ==
Oxalis glabra originates from southern Africa in Cape Province and is now concentrated in the southwestern region of Australia. It can be found in the Darling Scarp from Bunbury to Augusta and inland to Narrogin and Toodyay, as well as in the Avon Wheatbelt, Geraldton Sandplain, Jarrah Forest, Swan Coastal Plain, and Warren. Bulbs can be easily spread via water, contaminated soil or organism interactions, such as ants. Though spread throughout Western Australia, no seeds from the plant have been found in the region. It will be able to establish itself best in environments that are already disturbed.

== Propagation & growth ==
The growing period can be affected by location, however the plant generally begins to produce flowers in May and can last through to October with an active growth period between April and November. The plant remains dormant throughout the winter months, and can also slip into dormancy during the summer if conditions are too hot. It is one of the fewer species in the genus to propagate with the use of bulbs, bulbils and stolons. The bulbs begin sprouting in the falling temperatures of autumn months and spread underground with a system of lateral stems, facilitating the persistent nature of this species. The bulbs themselves are tiny, measuring only 5-9mm in length. They are ovoid in shape, often with pointed tips and surrounded by a brown papery cover.

=== Soil requirements ===
Oxalis glabra favors heavy soils and clay. However, it will grow easily in sandy and laterite soils.

== Invasive characteristics ==
Oxalic acid structure

The ornamental flower of Oxalis glabra has made it a desirable addition to gardens, however it is often classified as a weed. Due to its underground growth process, it is difficult to eradicate. A single bulb can propagate into many independent plants and yield many more bulbils. The small size of the bulbs make them hard to detect and easy to spread. The plant grows in a dense carpet and can choke out indigenous species; if introduced to a disturbed community, Oxalis glabra will prevent native plants from repopulating the community. Destroying the shoots of the plant are ineffective as well as hand digging because bulbs easily break free and remain in soil. Glyphosate, diuron and sulfonyl urea herbicides are most effective in eradication; herbicides should be applied at first sight of flowering because at this stage the bulbs will be exhausted.

Members of the genus Oxalis produce the toxin oxalic acid. In low amounts, this toxin is harmless and is even found in common produce, such as broccoli, spinach and Brussels sprouts. In higher amounts the toxin can have damaging effects that lead to hypocalcemia; this is a concern among farmers who tend grazing livestock.

=== Edibility ===
The leaves of the plant are edible, and will yield a sour taste due to production of oxalic acid.
