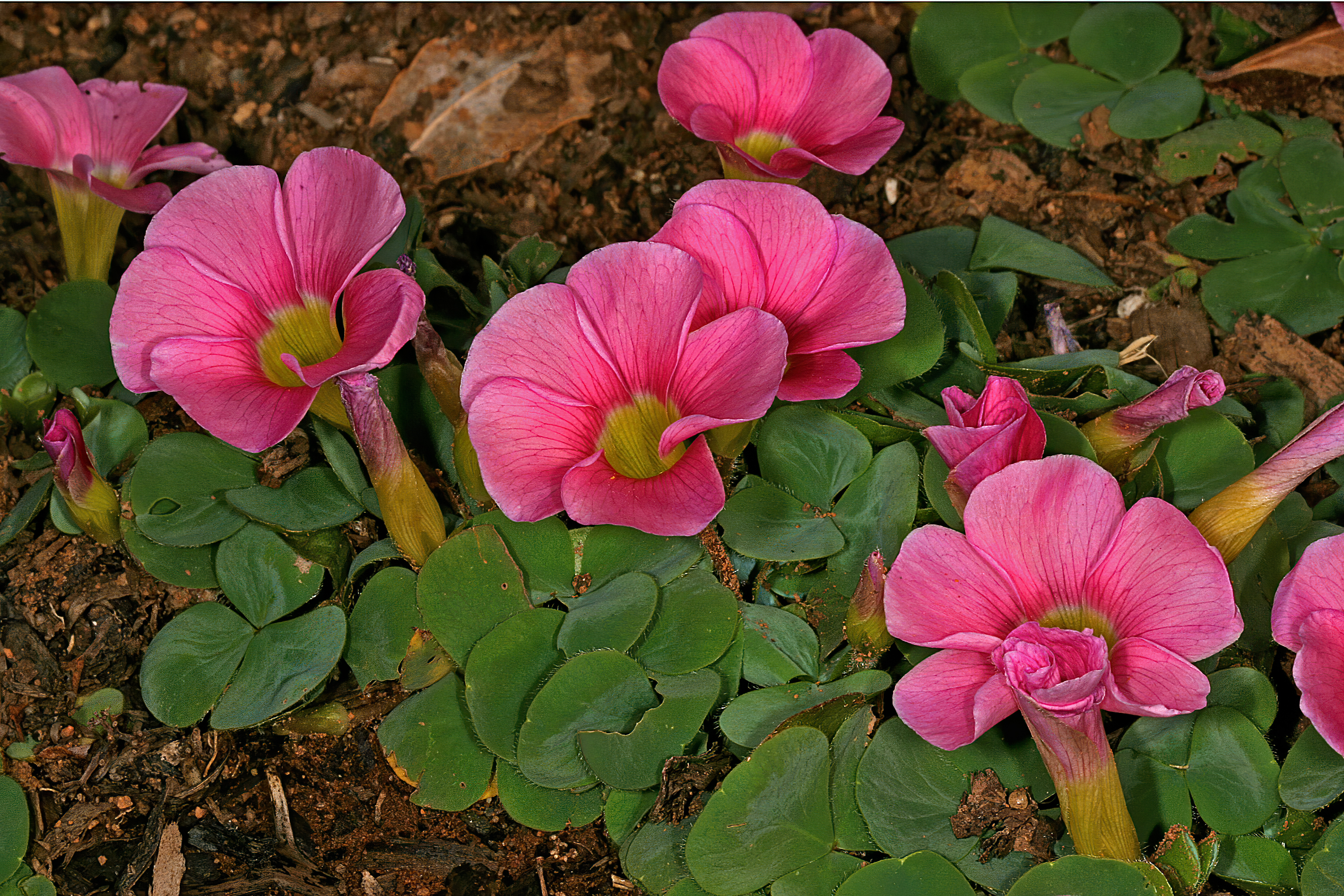

Scientific classification
- Kingdom: Plantae
- Clade: Tracheophytes
- Clade: Angiosperms
- Clade: Eudicots
- Clade: Rosids
- Order: Oxalidales
- Family: Oxalidaceae
- Genus: Oxalis
- Species: O. purpurea

Binomial name
- Oxalis purpurea L.

= Oxalis purpurea =

Species of flowering plant

Oxalis purpurea is a species of flowering plant in the woodsorrel family known by the common name purple woodsorrel. It is native to southern Africa, including South Africa, but it is known on most continents as an introduced species. It is cultivated as an ornamental plant.

== Description ==
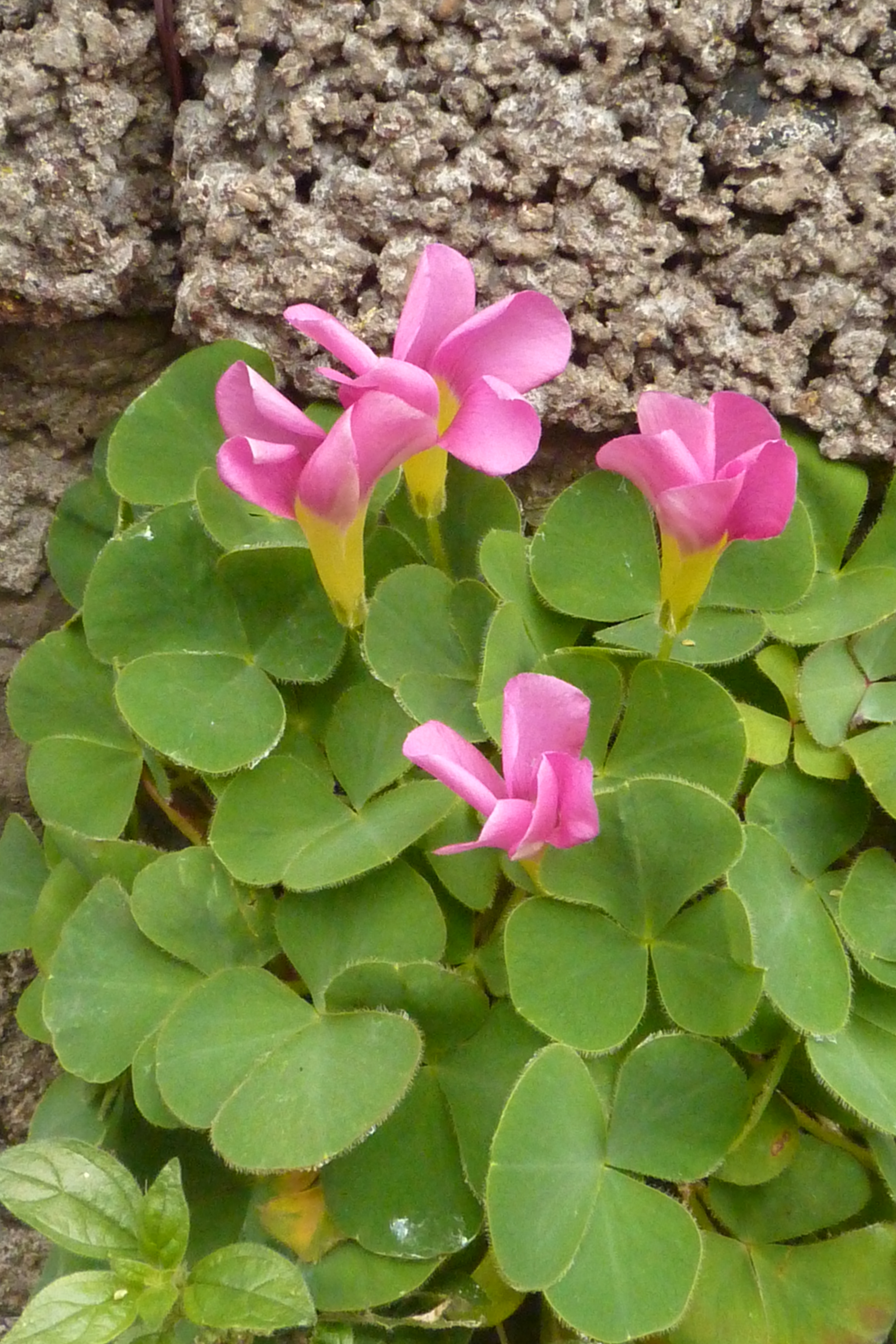
Leaves and flowers

This perennial herb grows from bulbs and produces a few basal leaves and flowers. The leaf is made up of three hairy leaflets of various shapes which are dark green in color, turning streaked and spotted with brown as they dry.

=== Flowers ===
The solitary flower arises on a stemlike peduncle and has five petals which may exceed two centimeters in length. The flower may be white to pink or purple-red.

== Weed status ==
Like a number of other oxalis species, O. purpurea is considered a weed in many places, including southern Australia (eastern New South Wales, Victoria and Tasmania), the south-eastern and southern parts of South Australia, and in the south-western and western parts of Western Australia.
