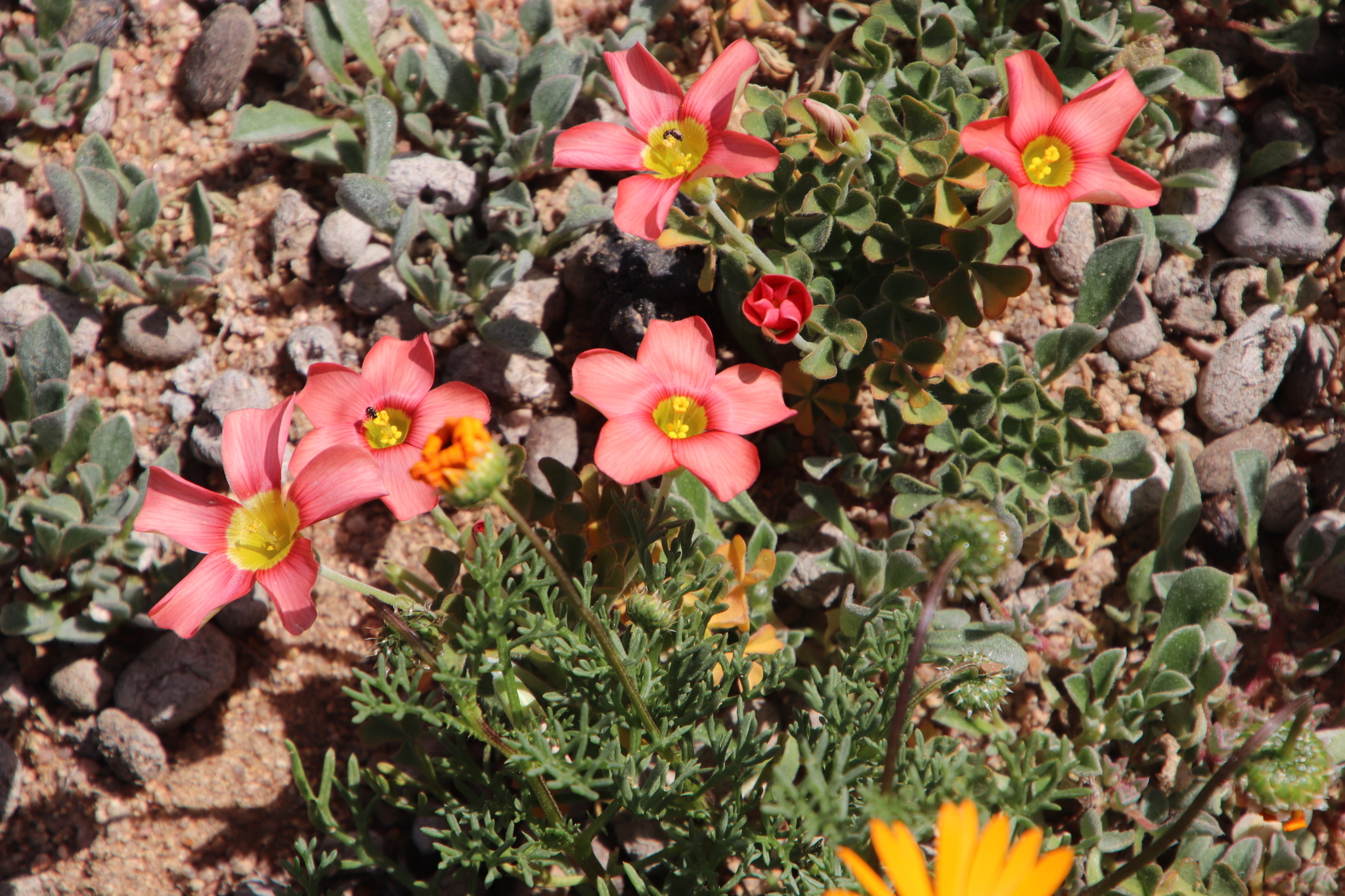

Conservation status
- Least Concern (SANBI Red List)

Scientific classification
- Kingdom: Plantae
- Clade: Tracheophytes
- Clade: Angiosperms
- Clade: Eudicots
- Clade: Rosids
- Order: Oxalidales
- Family: Oxalidaceae
- Genus: Oxalis
- Species: O. obtusa

Binomial name
- Oxalis obtusa Jacq.

Synonyms
- Acetosella cruentata (J.Jacq.) Kuntze; Acetosella obtusa (Jacq.) Kuntze; Oxalis atrata Weintroub; Oxalis ciliariflora Eckl. & Zeyh.; Oxalis cruentata J.Jacq.; Oxalis cuneata Sond.; Oxalis cuneiformis T.M.Salter & Exell; Oxalis cuprea G.Lodd.; Oxalis fimbriata E.Phillips; Oxalis framesii L.Bolus; Oxalis fugax Schltr. ex R.Knuth; Oxalis lacunosa Eckl. & Zeyh.; Oxalis membranacea Weintroub; Oxalis pearsonii R.Knuth; Oxalis plagiantha E.Mey.; Oxalis rondeboschensis R.Knuth; Oxalis schultzei R.Knuth; Oxalis stylosa E.Mey.; Oxalis thermarum Eckl. & Zeyh.

= Oxalis obtusa =

Flowering plants endemic to the Cape Provinces

Oxalis obtusa is a species of flowering plant in the genus Oxalis. It is native to the Cape Provinces, and KwaZulu-Natal in South Africa.

== Conservation status ==
Oxalis obtusa is classified as Least Concern.
