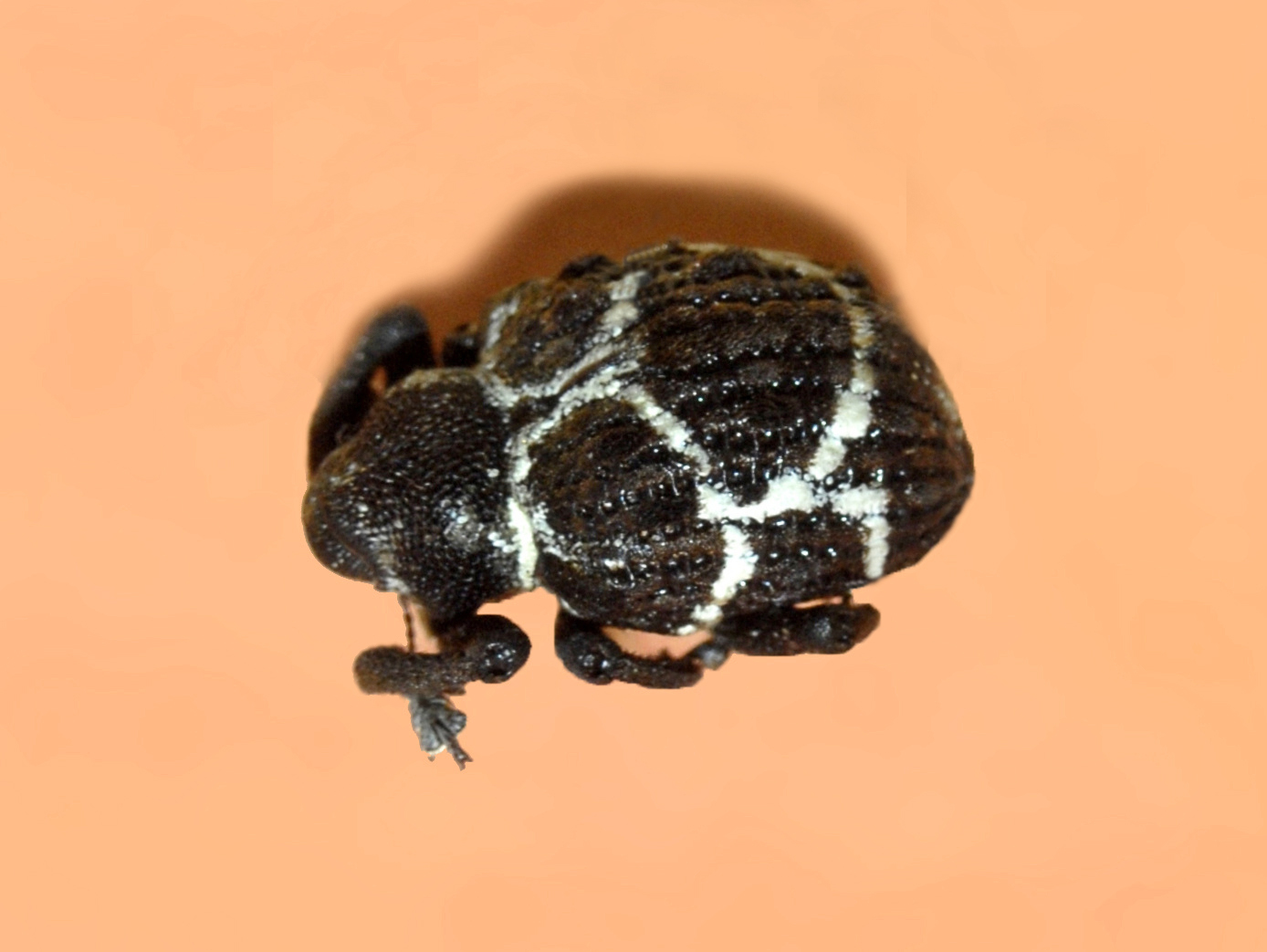
- Museum specimen of Desmidophorus cumingi

Scientific classification
- Kingdom: Animalia
- Phylum: Arthropoda
- Clade: Pancrustacea
- Class: Insecta
- Order: Coleoptera
- Suborder: Polyphaga
- Infraorder: Cucujiformia
- Superfamily: Curculionoidea
- Family: Brachyceridae; Billberg, 1820

Diversity
- at least 150 genera

= Brachyceridae =

Family of beetles

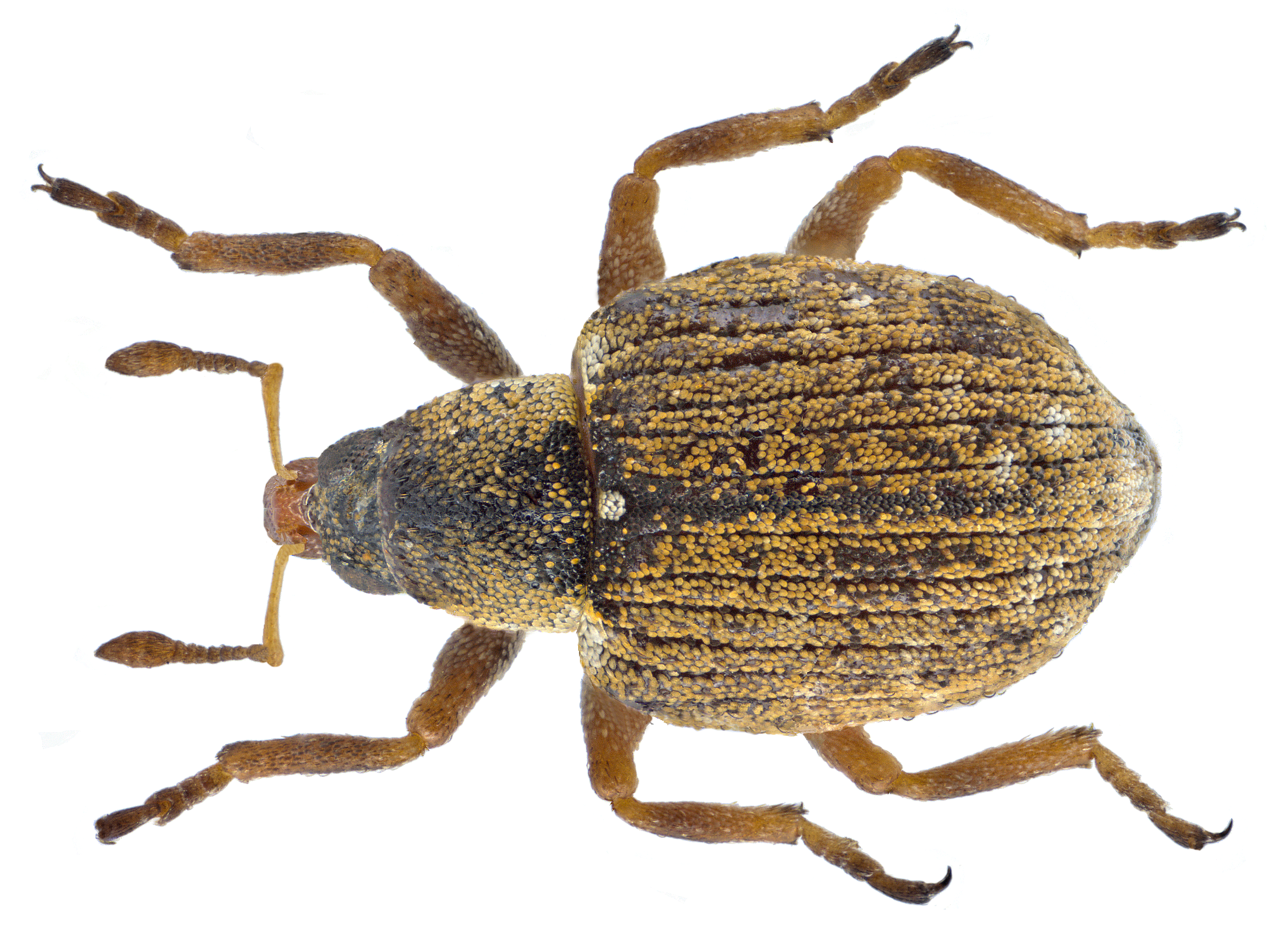
Stenopelmus rufinasus

Brachyceridae is a family of weevils. There are at least 150 genera in the family Brachyceridae. It has been treated as a subfamily of Curculionidae.

== Cladogram ==
- Curculionoidea
  - Brachyceridae
    - Brachycerus
    - Brotheus
    - Byrsops
    - Cryptops
    - Daulaxius
    - Desmidophorinus
    - Desmidophorus
    - Dyerocera
    - Episus
    - Euretus
    - Euryxena
    - Gyllenhalia
    - Hoplitotrachelus
    - Ixodicus
    - Lagenisus
    - Liasotus
    - Microcerus
    - Neiphagus
    - Ocladius
    - Progradivus
  - Anthribidae
  - Attelabidae
  - Belidae
  - Brentidae
  - Cryptolaryngidae
  - Curculionidae
  - Dryophthoridae
  - Eccoptarthridae
  - Nemonychidae

== See also ==
- List of Brachyceridae genera
