= List of Roman sites in Lincolnshire =

This is a list of all known Roman sites within the county of Lincolnshire.

== Settlements ==
Name	Roman Name	Type	Location	Coordinates	Dates	Notes	Image
Alkborough	Aquis	Fortified Settlement	Alkborough				
Ancaster	?	Fortified Settlement	Ancaster				
Brant Broughton	Briga	Settlement	Brant Broughton				
Broughton	Praetorium		Broughton				
Caistor	?	Fortified Settlement	Caistor				
Dragonby	?	Settlement	Dragonby				
Great Casterton	?	Fortified Settlement	Great Casterton, Rutland			Though the settlement is in Rutland, it is also the location where Ermine Street crossed the River Gwash close to the modern boundary between Rutland and Lincolnshire.	
Hibaldstow	?	Settlement	Hibaldstow				
Horncastle	Bannovalum?	Fortified Settlement	Horncastle				
Kirmington	?	Fortified Settlement	Kirmington			On site of earlier Iron Age fortified settlement.	
Kirton in Lindsey	Inmedio	Settlement	Kirton in Lindsey				
Lincoln	Lindum Colonia	Colonia/Legionary Fortress	Lincoln				
Louth	Luda	Settlement	Louth				
Ludford	?	Settlement	Ludford				
Marton	?	Fort	Marton			On Till Bridge Lane next to its crossing of the River Trent.	
Navenby	?	Settlement	Navenby			Sits upon Ermine Street. Evidence of Bronze and Iron Age activity.	
Owmby	?	Settlement	Owmby				
Saltersford	Causennis?	Settlement	Little Ponton and Stroxton				
Sapperton	Causennis?	Fortified Settlement	Sapperton				
Sleaford	Bannovalum?	Settlement	Sleaford				
Stow	Sidnacester	Settlement	Stow				
Tattershall	Drurobrivis	Settlement	Tattershall				
Torksey	Tiovulfingacester	Settlement	Torksey				
Wainfleet	Vainona	Settlement	Wainfleet				
Ulceby Cross	?	Settlement	Ulceby				
Willoughby	Verometum	Settlement	Willoughby				
Winteringham	Ad Abum	Settlement	Winteringham				

== Other ==
Name	Roman Name	Type	Location	Coordinates	Dates	Notes	Image
Barrs Farm Villa	?	Villa	Hemingby	TF24157331		Historic England. "Monument No. 352988". Research records (formerly PastScape).	
Baths	?	Baths	Lincoln (Steep Hill/Danes Terrace)				
Baumber Cursus	?	Cursus	Baumber			Possible Roman cursus	
Bourne-Morton Canal	?	Canal	Between Bourne and Morton			Only traceable through crop-marks.	
Car Dyke	?	Canal	Western Edge of The Fens			85 miles long	
Castellum Aquæ	?	Water Tank	Lincoln (East Bight)				
Denton Villa	?	Villa	Denton	SK87593094		Historic England. "Monument No. 323786". Research records (formerly PastScape).	
East Gate	?	Gate	Lincoln (Eastgate)				
Ermine Street	?	Road	Between London and York, via Stamford, Grantham, Ancaster, Lincoln, Scunthorpe				
Forum	?	Forum	Lincoln (Bailgate)			Granite stones mark locations of the now subsurface columns.	
Foss Dyke	?	Canal	Between Lincoln and Torksey		c.120AD		
Fosse Way	?	Road	Between Exeter and Lincoln			230 miles in length	
Glentworth Hall Villa	?	Villa	Glentworth	SK94378828		Historic England. "Monument No. 920235". Research records (formerly PastScape).	
Gravel Pit Farm Villa	?	Villa	Kirton in Lindsey	SK939966		Historic England. "Monument No. 1063122". Research records (formerly PastScape).	
Gravestone	?	Gravestone	Lincoln (St Mary le Wigford)			Reused by the Danes. Now set in the wall of the Norman tower.	
Haceby Villa	?	Villa	Haceby	TF01953692		Historic England. "Monument No. 348661". Research records (formerly PastScape).	
High Street	?	Road	Between Horncastle and Caistor, via Baumber. Possibly on to The Humber.			Ancient Ridgeway used and straightened by the Romans.	
Horkstow Villa	?	Villa	Horkstow	SE98491914		Historic England. "Monument No. 63618". Research records (formerly PastScape).	
King Street	?	Road	Between Peterborough and Ancaster via Bourne and Sapperton.				
Kirmond le Mire Villa	?	Villa	Kirmond le Mire	TF183930		Historic England. "Monument No. 893061". Research records (formerly PastScape).	
Lady Well	?	Natural Spring	Ancaster			Reputedly the water-source for Roman Ancaster.	
Lead Coffin	?	Coffin (Lead)	Baumber (Churchyard)			Found in Baumber churchyard in 1892.	
Mareham Lane	?	Road	Between Bourne and Sleaford, and possibly on to Lincoln.				
Mere Balk Lane	?	Road	Between Stixwould and Saltfleetby, via Hemingby and Tathwell.			Reputedly of Roman Origin due to its straightness.	
Milestone	?	Milestone	Lincoln (St Mary's Guildhall)			First Milestone south of Roman Lincoln.	
Mint Wall	?	Basicalla	Lincoln (West Bight)				
Mount Pleasant Farm Villa	?	Villa	Kirton in Lindsey	SE93940038		Historic England. "Monument No. 63566". Research records (formerly PastScape).	
Newport Arch	?	Gate	Lincoln		3rd century	Reputedly the oldest arch in the United Kingdom still used by traffic	
Norton Disney Villa	?	Villa	Norton Disney	SK85896028		Historic England. "Monument No. 324486". Research records (formerly PastScape).	
Owmby	?	Settlement	Owmby				
Posterngate	?	Gate	Lincoln (Saltersgate)			Under RBS Bank. Limited public access.	
Riseholme Barrow	?	Burial Barrow	Riseholme		1st century		
Roxby Villa	?	Villa	Roxby	SE92031697		Historic England. "Monument No. 63684". Research records (formerly PastScape).	
Scampton Villa	?	Villa	Scampton	SK95527847		Historic England. "Monument No. 326410". Research records (formerly PastScape).	
South Gate (Upper)	?	Gate	Lincoln (Steep Hill)			Fragments between numbers 25 and 26, and within 44, Steep Hill.	
St Paul in the Bail	?	Church	Lincoln (Bailgate)		4th century		
Stainby Villa	?	Villa	Stainby	SK921222		Historic England. "Monument No. 325510". Research records (formerly PastScape).	
Stoke Rochford Villa	?	Villa	Stoke Rochford	SK9328		Historic England. "Monument No. 325445". Research records (formerly PastScape).; Historic England. "Monument No. 325448". Research records (formerly PastScape).	
Sudbrooke Villa	?	Villa	Sudbrooke	TF037765		Excavated since 2005	
Till Bridge Lane	?	Road	Between Ermine Street north of Lincoln and York, via Doncaster, Castleford and Tadcaster.				
Walesby Villa	?	Villa	Walesby	TF14739262		Historic England. "Monument No. 351895". Research records (formerly PastScape).	
Wall	?	City Wall	Lincoln			Surviving fragments throughout the city.	
Wall	?	Town Wall	Horncastle			Surviving fragments throughout the town.	
Winterton Villa	?	Villa	Winterton	SE90961799		Historic England. "Monument No. 63693". Research records (formerly PastScape).	
Well	?	Well	Lincoln (Bailgate)			Next to St Paul in the Bail, now covered with glass screen. In use until the 17th century.	
West Gate (Lower)	?	Gate	Lincoln (Orchard Street)		3rd century		
West Gate (Upper)	?	Gate	Lincoln (Westgate)			No remains currently visible.	
