= Notiodes disgregus =

Scientific classification
- Domain: Eukaryota
- Kingdom: Animalia
- Phylum: Arthropoda
- Class: Insecta
- Order: Coleoptera
- Suborder: Polyphaga
- Infraorder: Cucujiformia
- Family: Erirhinidae
- Genus: Notiodes
- Species: N. disgregus

Binomial name
- Notiodes disgregus (Burke, 1961)

Species of beetle

Notiodes disgregus is a species of marsh weevil in the beetle family Brachyceridae.
