= Notiodes punctatus =

Scientific classification
- Kingdom: Animalia
- Phylum: Arthropoda
- Class: Insecta
- Order: Coleoptera
- Suborder: Polyphaga
- Infraorder: Cucujiformia
- Family: Erirhinidae
- Genus: Notiodes
- Species: N. punctatus

Binomial name
- Notiodes punctatus (LeConte, 1876)

Species of beetle

Notiodes punctatus is a species of marsh weevil in the family Erirhinidae, although it is often treated as a member of the family Brachyceridae. It is found in North America.
