= River Till, Lincolnshire =

River in Lincolnshire, England

River Till
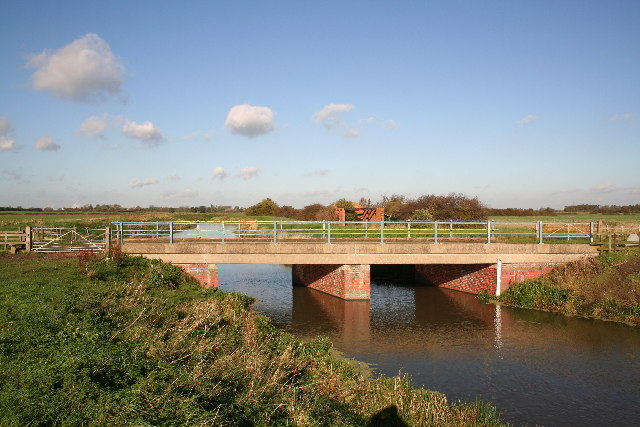
- The bridge carrying Broxholme Lane over the River Till

Location
- Country: England
- Counties: Lincolnshire

Physical characteristics
- Source
  - location: Corringham
  - elevation: 66 ft (20 m)
- Mouth
  - location: Brayford Pool, Lincoln
  - coordinates: 53°13′48″N 0°32′56″W
  - elevation: 13 ft (4.0 m)

The River Till is a river in the county of Lincolnshire in England and is ultimately a tributary of the River Witham. Its upper reaches drain the land east of Gainsborough. The middle section is embanked, as the water level is higher than that of the surrounding land, and pumping stations pump water from low level drainage ditches into the river. Its lower reaches from the hamlet of Odder near Saxilby into the city of Lincoln were canalised, possibly as early as Roman times, as part of the Foss Dyke.

Much of the channel is managed by the Environment Agency as it is classified as a main river, while the upper river and the land drainage ditches which border the river are managed by the Upper Witham internal drainage board. In order the help protect the city of Lincoln from flooding, a sluice has been built across the channel at the Till Washlands site. When flooding is a possibility, the sluice is closed, and other sluices allow the surrounding farmland to be inundated until water levels start to fall again. The defences were first used in 2000, and successfully prevented flood damage in Lincoln in the summer of 2007.

There are issues with water quality on much of the river, caused by run-off from agricultural land, physical modification of the river channel, and discharges from sewage treatment works. In 2011, a stretch of the river near Saxilby was affected by the invasive aquatic fern Azolla. An environmental project to control the fern saw some 8,000 Azolla weevils (Stenopelmus rufinasus) released into the river. As they feed exclusively on the fern, once the fern has been consumed they die out naturally without affecting native species.

== Course ==
The river rises as a series of streams, close to the 66-foot (20 m) contour near Corringham, Lincolnshire, a little to the east of Gainsborough. Its course heads towards the south, passing under a bridge near Heapham Windmill, a grade II listed three-storey tower mill dating from around 1878, and then flowing to the west of the village. Sturgate Airfield is on the east bank, and it turns briefly to the east to pass under Common Lane, and then south again, where it is crossed by Cow Lane, both minor roads leading to Upton. Upton Sewage Treatment Works is sited on the west bank, and the river passes under Glentworth Road, to the east of Kexby. The river drops below the 33-foot (10 m) contour to reach Willingham by Stow, where it skirts the eastern fringe of the village, passing under two bridges, between which is another sewage treatment works on the eastern bank. To the south of the village, it is joined by a tributary, which drains an area to the west and flows under the B1241 Stow Road to join the Till.

The river turns towards the south-east, passing under another minor road, and then turns to the south again, to Squire's Bridge on Ingham Road, Stow. Passing to the east of Sturton by Stow, it is crossed by a minor road at Thorpe Bridge, and by the A1500, once the course of a Roman road, at Tillbridge. It passes to the east of Bransby and is joined by a tributary on its eastern bank, before passing to the west of Broxholme. To the north-east of Saxilby, it is crossed by Broxholme Lane, and then passes through a flood defence sluice, which is used to cause local flooding of the washlands at times when Lincoln might otherwise be flooded. Beyond is a land drainage pumping station, and another bridge also carrying Broxholme Lane. The A57 road runs along the north bank of the Foss Dyke, and crosses the Till where it joins the Foss Dyke.

The final section is normally known as the Foss Dyke, although it can be considered as a canalisation of the lower Till. The construction of the Foss Dyke is often considered to date from Roman times, although this is debated by scholars, but the present channel dates from the 18th century. The channel flows in a south-easterly direction, and there is an off-line marina at Burton Waters, built in connection with a housing development. The Lincoln to Gainsborough railway line runs along the southern bank, and both are crossed by the A46 road. An aqueduct carries the Foss Dyke over a drainage channel called the Main Drain, and the A57 road crosses again as the river enters Brayford Pool, a widening of the River Witham in the centre of Lincoln.

== History ==
The River Till drains an area of Lincolnshire bounded by Gainsborough in the north-west and Lincoln in the south-east, where it joins the River Witham at Brayford Pool. The river is enclosed by earth embankments on both sides of the channel, to increase its capacity and to prevent flood water from inundating the surrounding land. These stretch from Stow Road Bridge to its junction with the Foss Dyke. Lincolnshire suffered severe flooding in 1795, when the River Trent breached its bank at Spalford, inundating some 20,000 acres (81 km^{2}) between the Trent and Lincoln, including swamp land at Broxholme and land at Saxilby where gorse and ling were grown. Lincoln High Street acted as a dam, penning the water to the west of the city, where water levels on the Foss Dyke were some 8 feet (2.4 m) above normal levels, and the flood water remained there for nearly three weeks. Following the disaster, an Act of Parliament was obtained on 20 July 1804, which created two drainage boards, the Lincoln West (North District) board being responsible for some 1,540 acres (620 ha) straddling the Foss Dyke and the River Till, while the Lincoln West (South District) board had responsibility for 2,330 acres (940 ha) bordering the upper Witham. The boards were required to embank and drain the lands. The banks of the Till were extended during the 20th century, although below Tillbridge most were in place by 1886, when the first Ordnance Survey maps of the area were published.

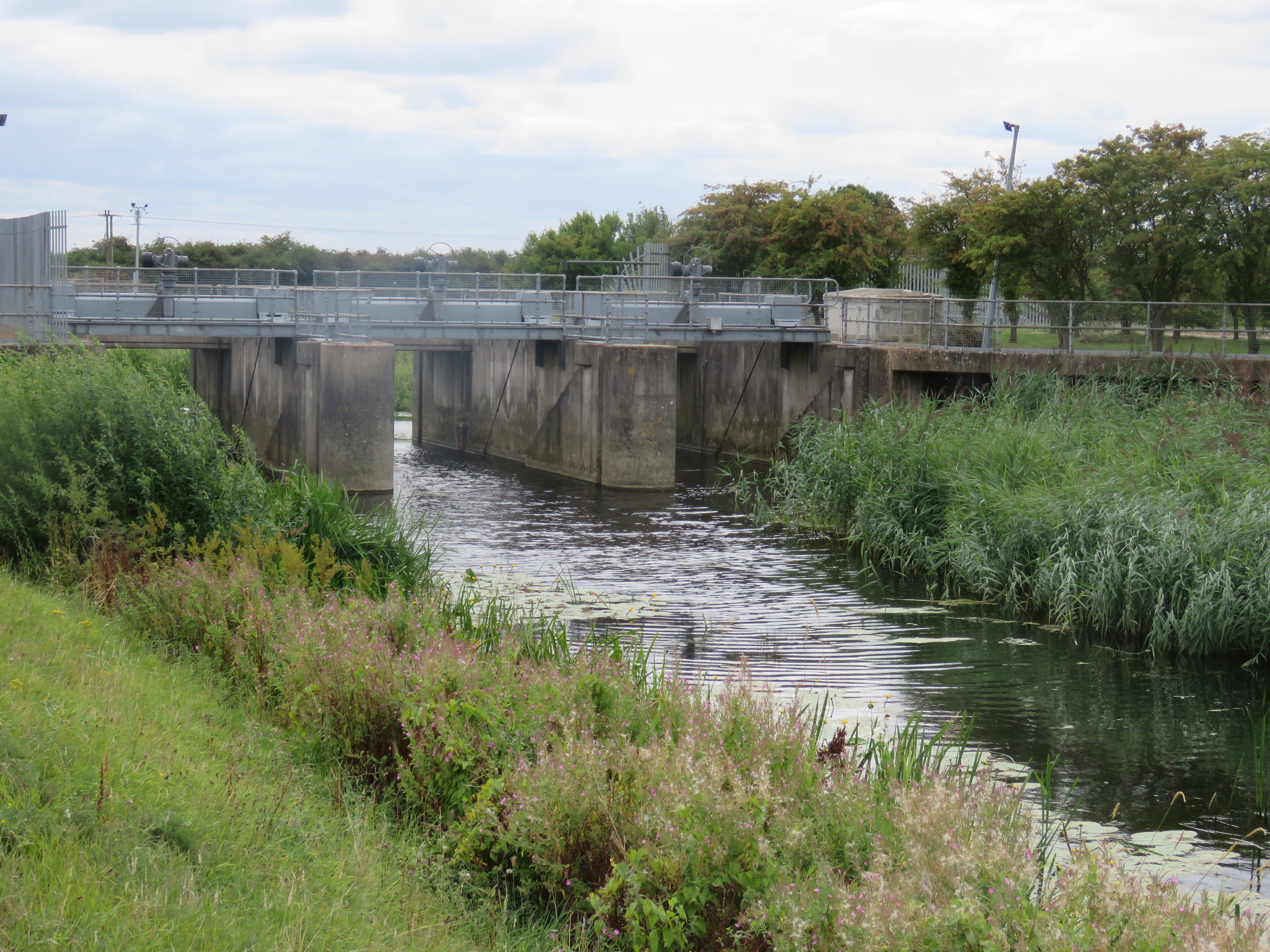
The Till Washlands main sluice allows the flow of the river to be stopped during a flood event.

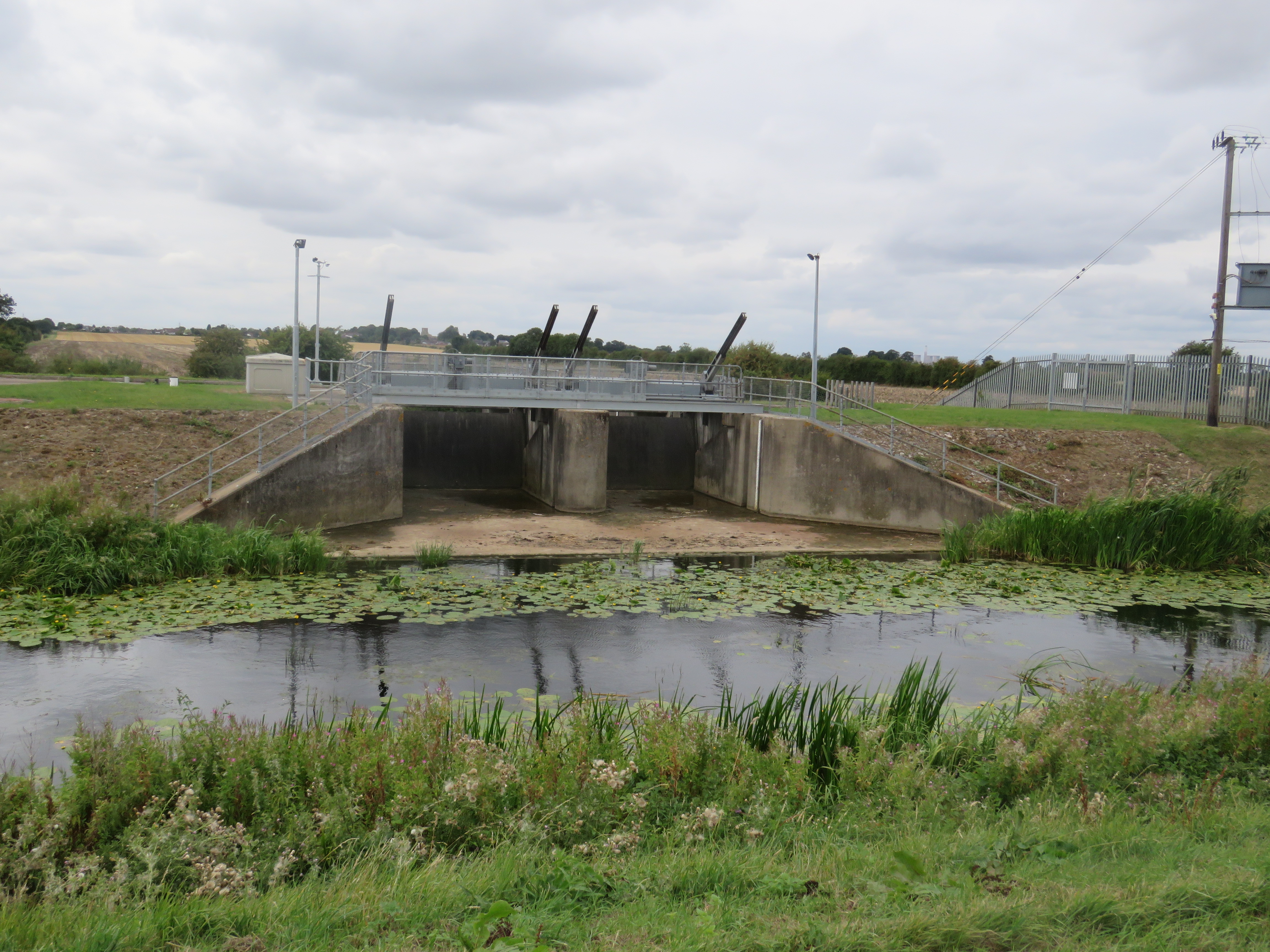
The west sluice allows washland to be flooded to the west of the river to protect the city of Lincoln.

Water from land to the south of the Till drained into the Sincil Dyke through a tunnel under the River Witham. In order to drain land to the north more effectively, the Commissioners of the North District were authorised to construct a cast-iron tunnel under the Foss Dyke at Bishop Bridge, and a section of main drain which would link it to the main drain for the South District. In addition, they were to build a catchwater drain at a higher level, to intercept run-off from the high grounds, which empties into the Foss Dyke at Bishop Bridge. By the time the work was completed, together with other work in the South District, the drainage scheme was more or less as it exists today. Many of the drains were protected by sluice doors, which were operated either automatically or manually, but before 1930, some water was pumped from the land at Broxholme and Saxilby with the pumps being maintained by the Church Commissioners or private landowners. However, during flood events, levels in the main drains rose rapidly, and the pumps could often not be used when they were needed most. With the passing of the Land Drainage Act 1930, responsibilities were rationalised, with the Witham and Steeping Rivers Catchment Board having overall responsibility, and the Upper Witham Internal Drainage Board being constituted to manage the land drainage functions from 1 April 1933. The North District and South District Boards were abolished, and the Catchment Board took over the functions of the Lincolnshire and Nottinghamshire Commissioners of Sewers. Subsequent legislation resulted in the Catchment Board being replaced by the Lincolnshire River Board in 1950, the Lincolnshire River Authority in 1965, the Anglian Water Authority in 1973, the National Rivers Authority in 1989 and finally the Environment Agency from 1996. Most of the Till, one of its tributaries and the Catchwater Drain are designated main rivers, and are maintained by the Environment Agency, while the upper river and the many drainage ditches bordering the lower river are the responsibility of the Upper Witham internal drainage board.

Some 20,000 people live in regions of Lincoln that are susceptible to flooding. Most of the city's industrial buildings and around half of the commercial property is also at a high risk from flooding. There were major floods in the city in 1947 and 1958, and the amount of water delivered to the city by the River Till was a significant factor in the 1958 floods. Following these events, feasibility studies were carried out in 1977 to identify ways to mitigate flooding in the city. This resulted in the construction of two washlands, one where the River Brant joins the River Witham, to the south of Lincoln, and the other on the River Till, to the north-west. Work began in 1984, and the two schemes can hold back 340 million cubic feet (9,600 Ml) of floodwater. In both cases, a shallow embankment was constructed across the river valley, and the river passes through a control sluice, which can be used to limit the volume of water travelling downstream. Inlet and outlet sluices in the embankments can be opened to allow the water to flood the Till washlands, rather than allowing river levels in the city to breach the defences. The water from the washlands is subsequently released as levels through the city return to normal. Draining of the washlands is assisted by pumping stations, and the scheme was completed in 1991.

The washlands were tested for the first time in 2000, when there was some local flooding of rural areas, and the storage of water prevented significant damage occurring in Lincoln. Much more serious was a flood event in the summer of 2007, which was caused by intense rainfall, and the flood defences worked as planned, with the River Till reservoir reaching 85 per cent full before water levels began to subside. The washlands were again partially filled in January 2008. A study carried out in 2010 noted that the Catchment Flood Management Plan for the Lincoln area recommends that the capacity of the washlands should be increased, to cope with the possible effects of climate change.

== Water quality ==
The Environment Agency measure the water quality of the river systems in England. Each is given an overall ecological status, which may be one of five levels: high, good, moderate, poor and bad. There are several components that are used to determine this, including biological status, which looks at the quantity and varieties of invertebrates, angiosperms and fish. Chemical status, which compares the concentrations of various chemicals against known safe concentrations, is rated good or fail.

The water quality of the River Till system was as follows in 2019.

Section	Ecological Status	Chemical Status	Length	Catchment	Channel
Tributary of Till	Poor	Fail	3.0 miles (4.8 km)	6.62 square miles (17.1 km^{2})	
Till (Witham)	Moderate	Fail	8.8 miles (14.2 km)	13.60 square miles (35.2 km^{2})	heavily modified
Fillingham Beck	Moderate	Fail	1.5 miles (2.4 km)	9.39 square miles (24.3 km^{2})	heavily modified
Lower Till	Moderate	Fail	6.8 miles (10.9 km)	19.62 square miles (50.8 km^{2})	heavily modified
Fossdyke Canal, River Till section	Moderate	Fail	4.3 miles (6.9 km)		artificial

The reasons for the quality being less than good include run-off from agricultural and rural land, physical modification of the channel for land drainage, and sewage discharge affecting the lower river sections. Like most rivers in the UK, the chemical status changed from good to fail in 2019, due to the presence of polybrominated diphenyl ethers (PBDE), perfluorooctane sulphonate (PFOS) and mercury compounds, none of which had previously been included in the assessment.

In 2011, around 2.5 miles (4 km) of the Till near Saxilby were affected by Azolla, a fast-growing aquatic fern originally imported to Britain from America in the 1840s for use in ornamental ponds. On the river, it was forming dense mats, depriving other river fauna and flora of oxygen and light. In order to combat it, the Environment Agency released 8,000 Azolla weevils (stenopelmus rufinasus) into the affected area. They feed exclusively on the fern, and were expected to increase rapidly to a population of millions in a few weeks. Because they only feed on Azolla, they die out naturally once they have consumed the weed, and do not affect native species. Previous attempts to clear the weed by mechanical means in June 2011 had not proved successful.

== See also ==
- Upper Witham IDB

== Bibliography ==
- Agency (2014). "The Witham Management Catchment" (PDF). Environment Agency. Archived (PDF) from the original on 24 July 2018.
- JBA (February 2010). Lincoln Policy Area Strategic Flood Risk Assessment Vol 1 (PDF). JBA Consulting. Archived from the original (PDF) on 28 July 2018.
- Marsh, Clare (July 2009). Strategic Flood Risk Assessment (PDF). West Lindsey District Council. Archived (PDF) from the original on 29 July 2018.
