= Brainsby =

Brainsby is an English surname. Notable people with the surname include:

- Harold Brainsby (1910–1975), New Zealand field athlete
- Tony Brainsby (1945–2000), British publicist

== See also ==
- Bransby
