= Sturton by Stow =

Village in Lincolnshire, England

Coordinates: 53.314873°N 0.665476°W

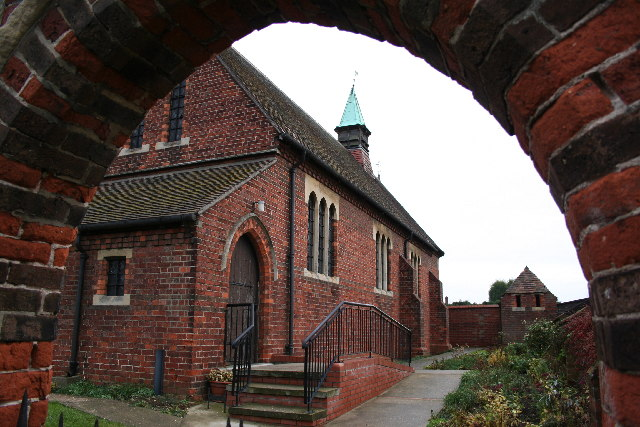
- St Hugh's Church, Sturton by Stow

- Location within Lincolnshire
- Population: 1,369 (2011)
- OS grid reference: SK890806
  - London: 125 mi (201 km) S
- District: West Lindsey
- Shire county: Lincolnshire
- Region: East Midlands
- Country: England
- Sovereign state: United Kingdom
- Post town: Lincoln
- Postcode district: LN1
- Dialling code: 01427
- Police: Lincolnshire
- Fire: Lincolnshire
- Ambulance: East Midlands
- UK Parliament: Gainsborough

Sturton by Stow is a village and civil parish in the West Lindsey district of Lincolnshire, England. The population of the civil parish was 1,369 at the 2011 census.

== History ==
The village is situated on the north-south B1241 and east–west A1500 Tillbridge Road (a Roman road). Nearby to the north is Stow. Sturton falls within the ecclesiastical parish of Stow, consequently the parish church of Sturton is Stow Minster. The Church of England maintained a mission church in Sturton, a brick building dedicated to St Hugh and designed by John Loughborough Pearson. The building was sold in January 2022 and is now in private ownership. The nearest churches are now Stow Minster, St Botolph's Church, Saxilby and St. Margaret of Antioch Church in Marton.

=== Visits ===
- The Duke of Gloucester visited the village on Wednesday 5 October 2005, to open new offices at Gelder Group
- The Duke visited Gelder Group again, on Friday 18 June 2010, having visited some schools in Grantham in the morning, then opened the new Gainsborough Education Village
- The Princess Royal visited Gelder Group on Thursday 17 July 2014, to open an education centre, in connection with the City and Guilds Institute

== Education ==
There is a primary school on School Lane.

=== Former secondary school ===
Planning permission for the secondary school was obtained in September 1958. Saxilby had been looked at too, as a site for the secondary modern school.

Construction began in late 1959. The Epworth secondary school was built at the same time. The school was planned to open in January 1961, but it took longer, so was planned to open in April 1961. The school opened in September 1961. The school would be officially opened on Friday 27 October 1961 by David Eccles, 1st Viscount Eccles, the Conservative Minister of Education.

The school cost £95,000 for 450 children from 27 villages - Gate Burton, Kexby, Marton, Willingham, Torksey, Sturton, Stow, North and South Carlton, Scampton, Saxilby, Ingham, Laughterton and Upton. The school was built by William Wright and Sons, of Lincoln. The playing fields were 10 acres. There were eight classrooms.

In May 1968 headteacher John Charles Capp retired. Michael Northway, from Ipswich, took over. Mr Capp was a special policeman, and a qualified football linesman, and moved to Wandover Road in Messingham, where he collapsed and died at home on Monday 25 May 1970, aged 63. Mr Capp had married in Scunthorpe in August 1934, and had attended grammar school in Grantham. Mr Northway lived in Willingham; one of his daughters went to Gainsborough High School and Edinburgh University.

In April 1987, a decision was made to close the school. The 1st and 4th years would not be admitted from September 1988, and everyone else would leave in July 1989. The headteacher Michael Northway, with deputy Don Smellie, had been at the school since 1961. Adrian East and Louise Pickwell were head boy and girl, for 1988, with Anthony Purchase and Tamsyn Davies, for the last year of the school.

The secondary school closed on Thursday 27 July 1989. At one time there were 500 at the school, but the school had only 50 children when it closed. Some children would go to the William Farr school instead, in Welton. Others went to the Castle Hills school in Gainsborough.

== Geography ==
The village public house is The New Plough Inn on Tillbridge Road. The River Till is 1 mile (1.6 km) to the east.
