= Burton Waters =

Marina village in Lincolnshire, England

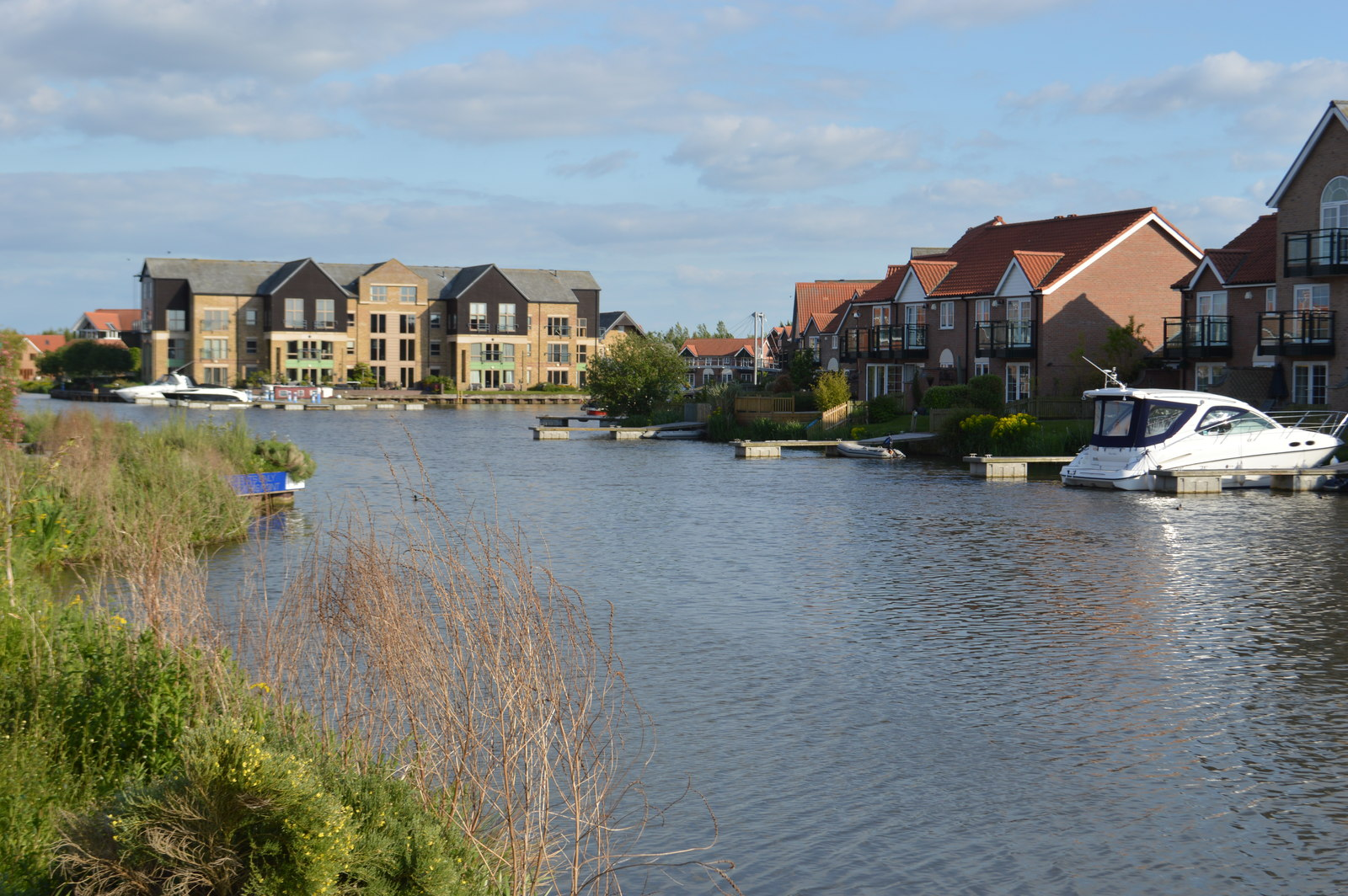
- Burton Waters, Lincolnshire

- Location within Lincolnshire
- Civil parish: Burton-by-Lincoln
- District: West Lindsey
- Shire county: Lincolnshire
- Region: East Midlands
- Country: England
- Sovereign state: United Kingdom
- Post town: Lincoln
- Postcode district: LN1
- Dialling code: 01522
- Police: Lincolnshire
- Fire: Lincolnshire
- Ambulance: East Midlands

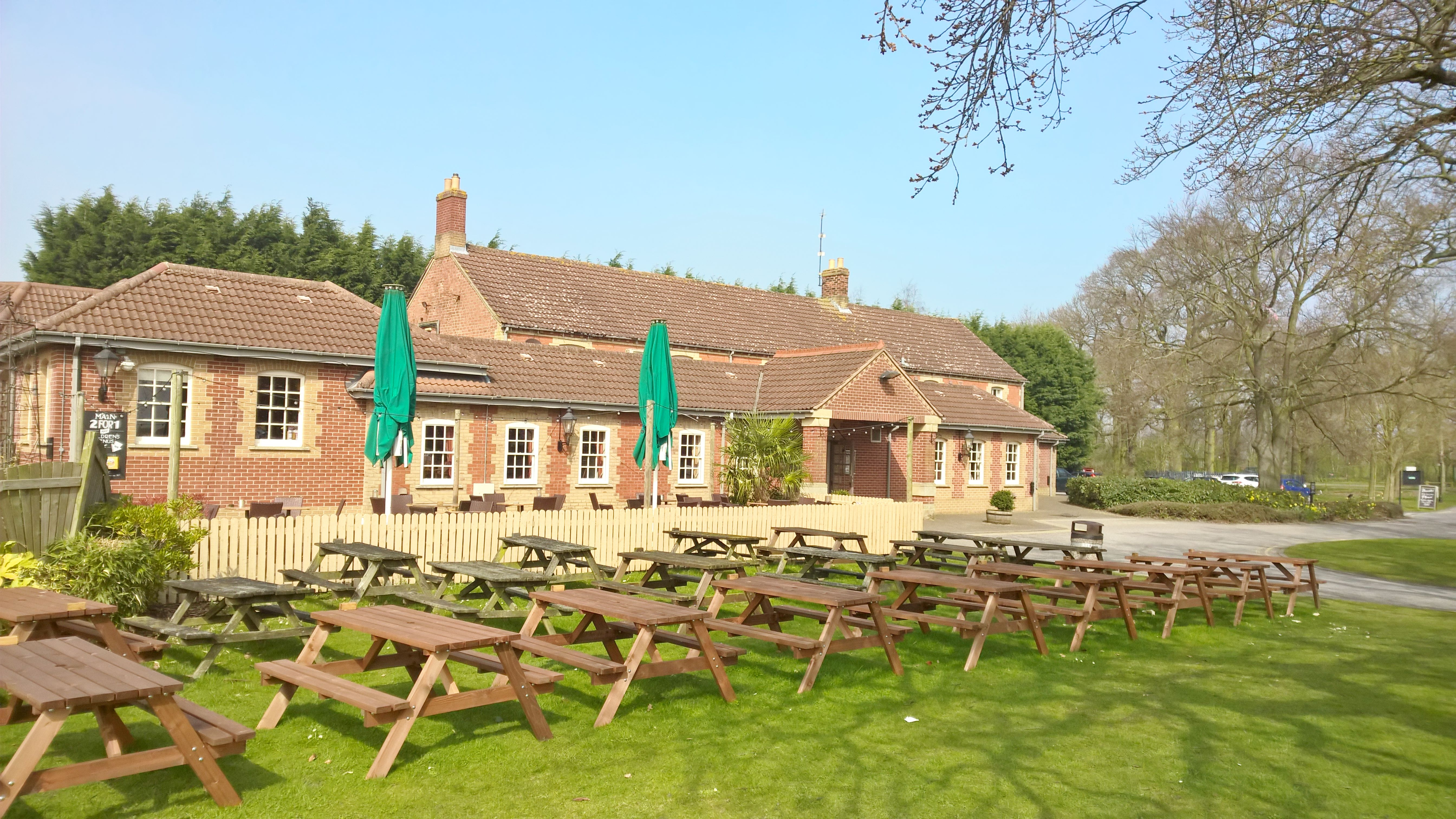
The Woodcocks Pub, Burton Waters

Burton Waters is a marina village in the civil parish of Burton in the West Lindsey district of Lincolnshire, England. It lies off the A57 road west of Lincoln, northeast of Skellingthorpe and southeast of Saxilby. The scheme attracted significant opposition that resulted in a public inquiry. Construction began in 1999.

== History ==
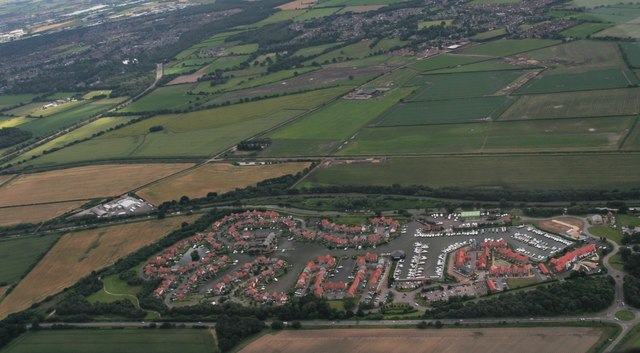
Aerial of Burton Waters

Over a three month period beginning in October 1998, prior to the commencement of groundworks, the City of Lincoln Archaeological Unit carried out a site survey on behalf of the developer. Prehistoric polished flint and stone axes have been found near to the site and during the archaeological survey an assemblage of flint workings was discovered, suggesting repeat activity at the site in the later Mesolithic period. Burton Waters sits alongside a section of the Fossdyke Navigation thought to be a cutting of the River Till by the Romans and used for water transportation. The land was known as Burton Fen and formerly owned by the Monson Estate. Prior to development the site comprised four arable fields and the Woodcocks Hotel and grounds. The site is level and being just above sea level was subject to seasonal flooding until drained by works carried out in the 17th and 18th centuries. The Fossdyke Navigation is the site's western boundary and forms part of the Burton parish and West Lindsey district boundaries; it was also part of the southern limit of the Ango-Saxon Kingdom of Lindsey. There is no firm evidence of inhabitation until the appearance on early 20th century maps of Fen Cottages and another group of buildings. Ordnance Survey maps of this period also show within the site a road (later designated the A57) and its junction with an unclassified road leading to the village of Burton; both had been realigned prior to the development commencing and the A57 now forms the settlement's eastern boundary.

Plans for a marina, homes, leisure facilities and shops at Burton Fen surfaced in March 1991. Despite opposition on environmental policy and planning grounds by West Lindsey District planning officers, Burton Parish Council and neighbouring Lincoln City Council, the scheme was approved in April 1992 by West Lindsey District planning committee, who highlighted prospects for job creation. The development plans, environmental report and scale model for Burton Waters are featured in the 1995 book "Communicating Design" as a case study illustrating real-world design. Owing to the weight of opposition to the scheme, the application was called in by Environment Secretary, John Gummer for a public inquiry. In March 1997 Burton Waters was given the go-ahead by an Environment Department inspector. Detailed plans for the 126-acre (51 ha) site were set out in a public consultation in October 1998 and included a 146 berth marina twice the size of Brayford Pool in Lincoln, 210 homes, a hotel and conference centre, shops, a clubhouse, leisure centre, two fishing lakes and another lake for water sports such as jet skiing, sailing and wind surfing. Groundworks commenced in June 1999 and construction of the health and leisure centre began a month later. By the end of 1999 the marina basin had been dug out and a link to the Fossdyke Navigation canal constructed.

Plans for a further 60 homes were announced in 2022.

== Geography ==
A September 2011 historic landscape characterisation placed Burton Waters in a landscape zone centred on the River Till. The study describes the area as entirely rural with isolated farmsteads and no historic nucleated settlements. Burton Waters is described as "unique within Lincolnshire as a combined housing and marina development". Geotechnical investigations from the 1998–99 archaeological survey revealed a solid geology of Lower Lias clay dipping towards the Fossdyke; this is overlain by river terrace sands and gravels in turn overlain by red and grey clays, sand and soil.

== Amenities ==
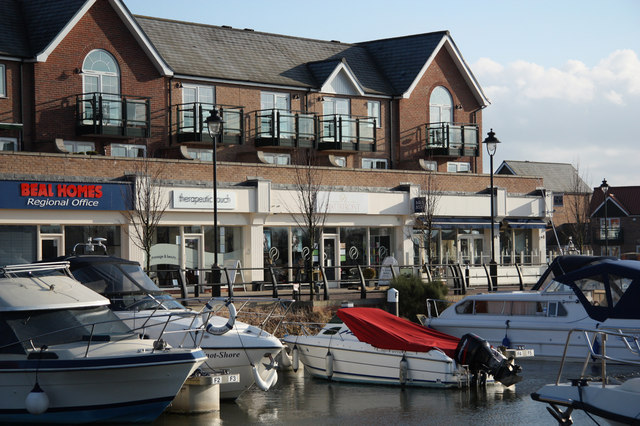
Shops and apartments at Burton Waters

Burton Waters has a small number of shops and restaurants and is home to several local businesses. The "Woodcocks", a Marston's public house and hotel is named after a prominent local resident and was built on the site of Lane End cottages. There is a David Lloyd Health and Leisure Centre on site. Moorings are available from Burton Waters Marina and businesses specialise in boat repairs, boat sales and boat hires. A new public footpath and cycleway was constructed along the Fossdyke in 2011 linking Burton Waters with Lincoln and Saxilby. A Lincoln-based cycle hire scheme established in 2013 was extended to Burton Waters a year later but is now closed.

== Transport ==
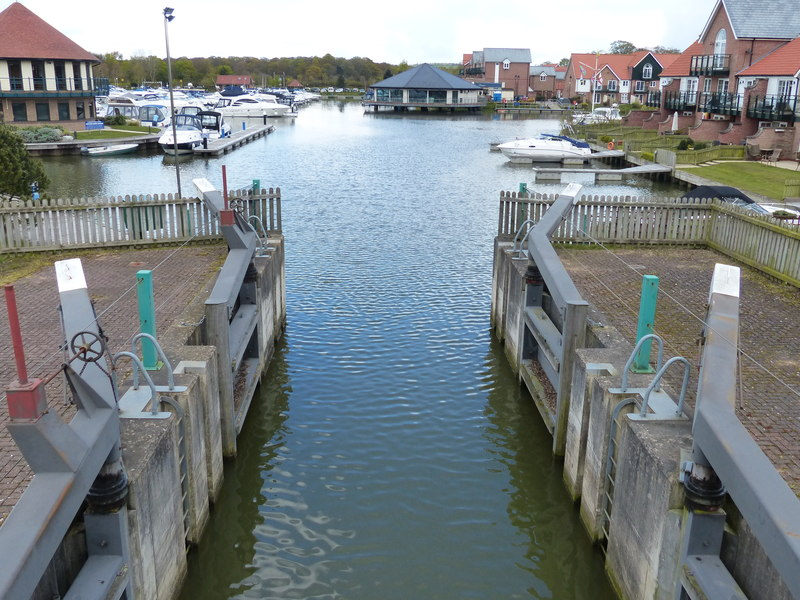
Water Lock at Burton Waters Marina

Buses connect Burton Waters to Lincoln and Saxilby, and there is a schools only service to Skellingthorpe. The development is close to the site of the long closed Skellingthorpe. The nearest railway stations are Saxilby on the Doncaster–Lincoln line, which runs alongside the Fossdyke Navigation, Hykeham and Lincoln.

== Demographics ==
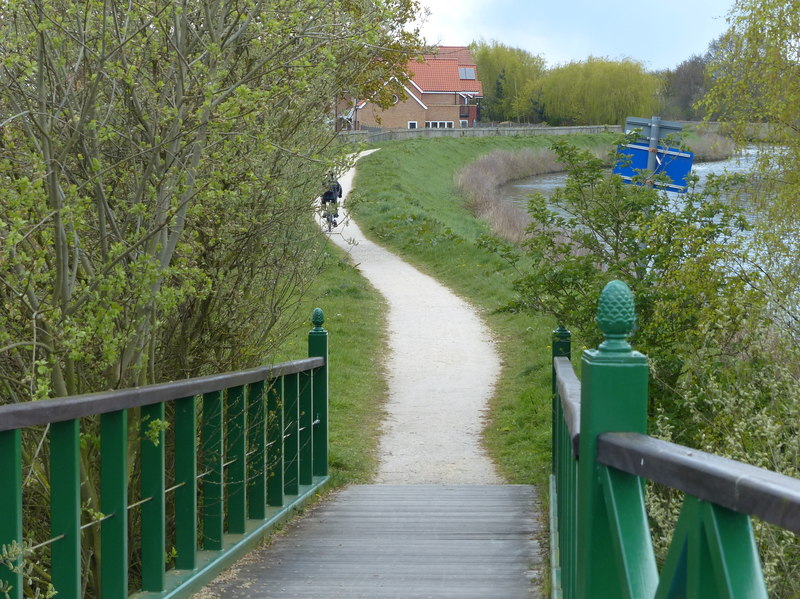
Fossdyke Canal Trail to Lincoln and Saxilby

In 2011 the wider parish of Burton was recorded at 865 residents.
