= A156 road =

Road in Lincolnshire, England

Coordinates: 53.3359°N 0.7461°W

A156

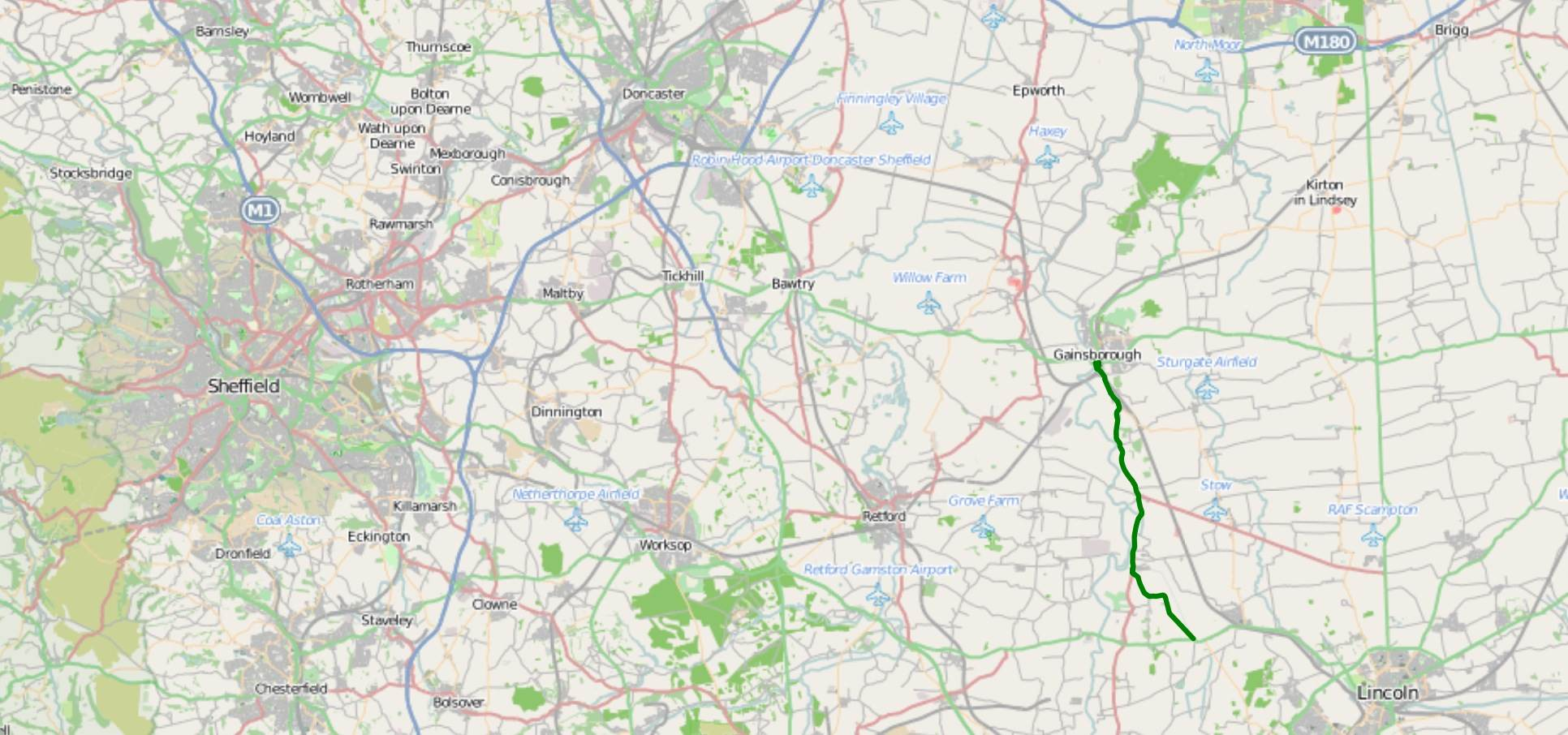
- Click map to enlarge

Route information
- Length: 11 mi (18 km)

Major junctions
- South end: A57 near Saxilby
- North end: A631 in Gainsborough

Location
- Country: United Kingdom

Road network
- Roads in the United Kingdom; Motorways; A and B road zones

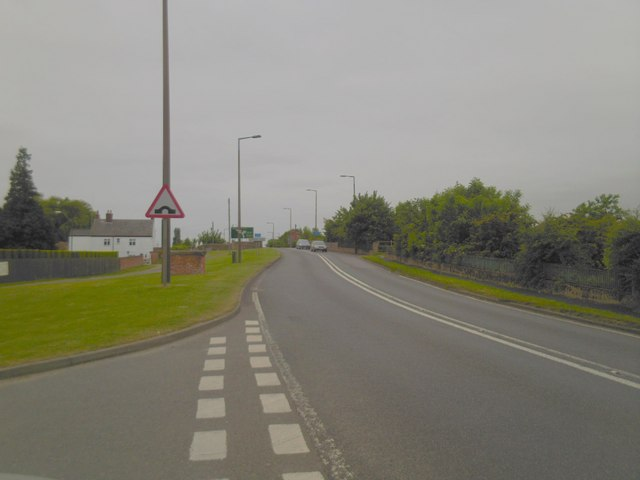
A156 at Torksey Lock

The A156 is an 11 miles (18 km) long road that runs from the A57 near Saxilby and heads north to Gainsborough. The road runs entirely within Lincolnshire right next to the border with Nottinghamshire. It is a single carriageway for its entire length apart from one small stretch at Torksey Lock where the A1133 joins from Newark-on-Trent.

== Route ==
The road starts just west of Saxilby where it branches off from the A57 from Lincoln. It heads northwest through the village of Fenton. The A1133 from Newark-on-Trent merges with the road slightly further on where it makes a sharp turn and heads north alongside the River Trent and the border with Nottinghamshire. Further on at Marton the A1500 joins from the east. The A156 continues on to Lea where the B1241 joins from Saxilby then the road heads into Gainsborough where it terminates just south of the centre at the A631. The A159 continues north from here through the town centre and north to Scunthorpe.
