= Notiodes limatulus =

Scientific classification
- Kingdom: Animalia
- Phylum: Arthropoda
- Class: Insecta
- Order: Coleoptera
- Suborder: Polyphaga
- Infraorder: Cucujiformia
- Family: Erirhinidae
- Genus: Notiodes
- Species: N. limatulus

Binomial name
- Notiodes limatulus (Gyllenhal, 1836)

Species of beetle

Notiodes limatulus is a species of marsh weevil in the beetle family Brachyceridae.
