= River Till =

River Till may refer to three rivers in England:

- River Till, Lincolnshire
- River Till, Northumberland
- River Till, Wiltshire
