= Burton, Lincolnshire =

Village in the West Lindsey district of Lincolnshire, England

Coordinates: 53.260190°N 0.558414°W

Burton
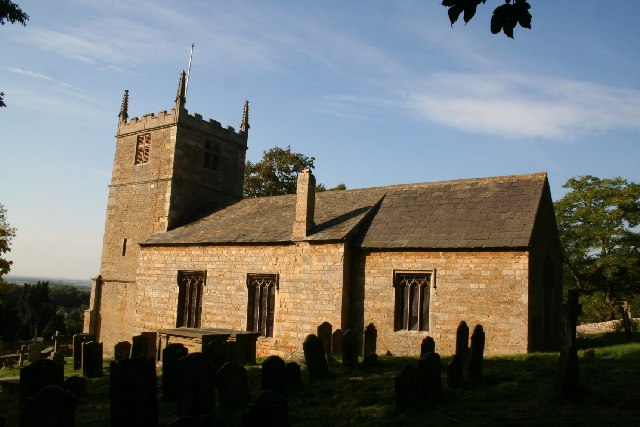
- Church of St Vincent, Burton

- Location within Lincolnshire
- Population: 625 (2011)
- OS grid reference: SK962746
  - London: 120 mi (190 km) S
- Civil parish: Burton
- District: West Lindsey
- Shire county: Lincolnshire
- Region: East Midlands
- Country: England
- Sovereign state: United Kingdom
- Post town: Lincoln
- Postcode district: LN1
- Police: Lincolnshire
- Fire: Lincolnshire
- Ambulance: East Midlands
- UK Parliament: Gainsborough
- Website: https://burton.parish.lincolnshire.gov.uk/

Burton is a civil parish in the West Lindsey district of Lincolnshire, England. Its core settlement is Burton-by-Lincoln. a village situated approximately 2 miles (3 km) north of the city of Lincoln. The village sits on the side of the Lincoln Cliff, which overlooks the River Trent Valley. The population of the parish at the 2011 census was 625.

Burton-by-Lincoln's Grade II listed Anglican church is dedicated to St Vincent of Saragossa. It is part of Springline ecclesiastical parish, which comprises nine churches in twelve communities to the north of Lincoln.

The main A57 runs through the south-east of the parish, towards Saxilby, from Odder.

== See also ==
- Burton upon Stather, a civil parish in North Lincolnshire
- Burton Waters, a marina village directly to the south and part of the parish
