= A1500 =

A1500 may refer to:

- Amiga 1500 computer
- A1500 road, a road in England
