= Notiodes setosus =

Scientific classification
- Kingdom: Animalia
- Phylum: Arthropoda
- Class: Insecta
- Order: Coleoptera
- Suborder: Polyphaga
- Infraorder: Cucujiformia
- Family: Erirhinidae
- Genus: Notiodes
- Species: N. setosus

Binomial name
- Notiodes setosus (LeConte, 1876)

Species of beetle

Notiodes setosus is a species of marsh weevil in the beetle family Brachyceridae.
