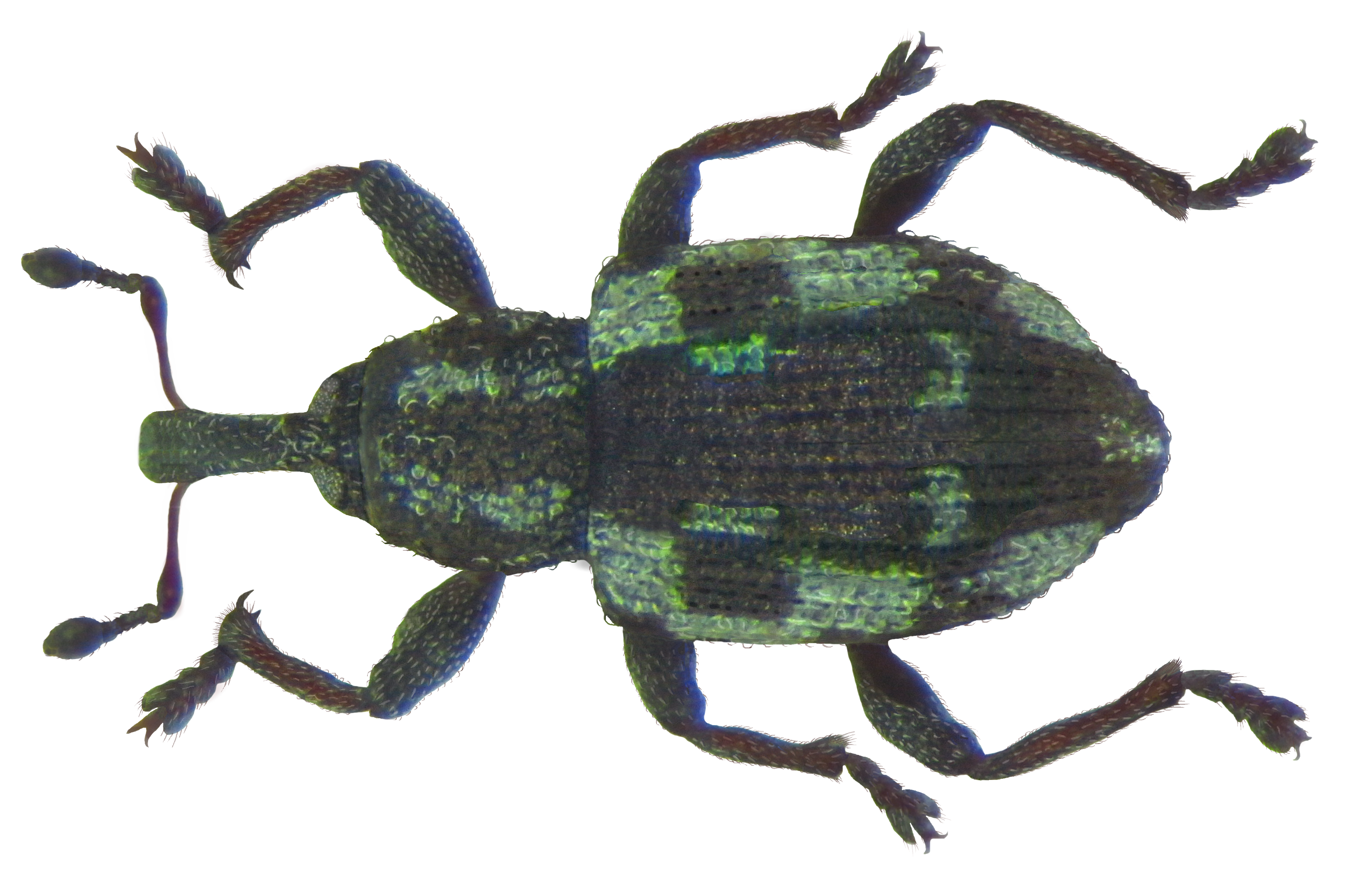
- Tanysphyrus lemnae 1,8 mm (1,4-1,8 mm)

Scientific classification
- Kingdom: Animalia
- Phylum: Arthropoda
- Clade: Pancrustacea
- Class: Insecta
- Order: Coleoptera
- Suborder: Polyphaga
- Infraorder: Cucujiformia
- Superfamily: Curculionoidea
- Family: Brachyceridae
- Genus: Tanysphyrus
- Species: T. lemnae

Binomial name
- Tanysphyrus lemnae (Paykull, 1792) .

= Tanysphyrus lemnae =

Species of beetle

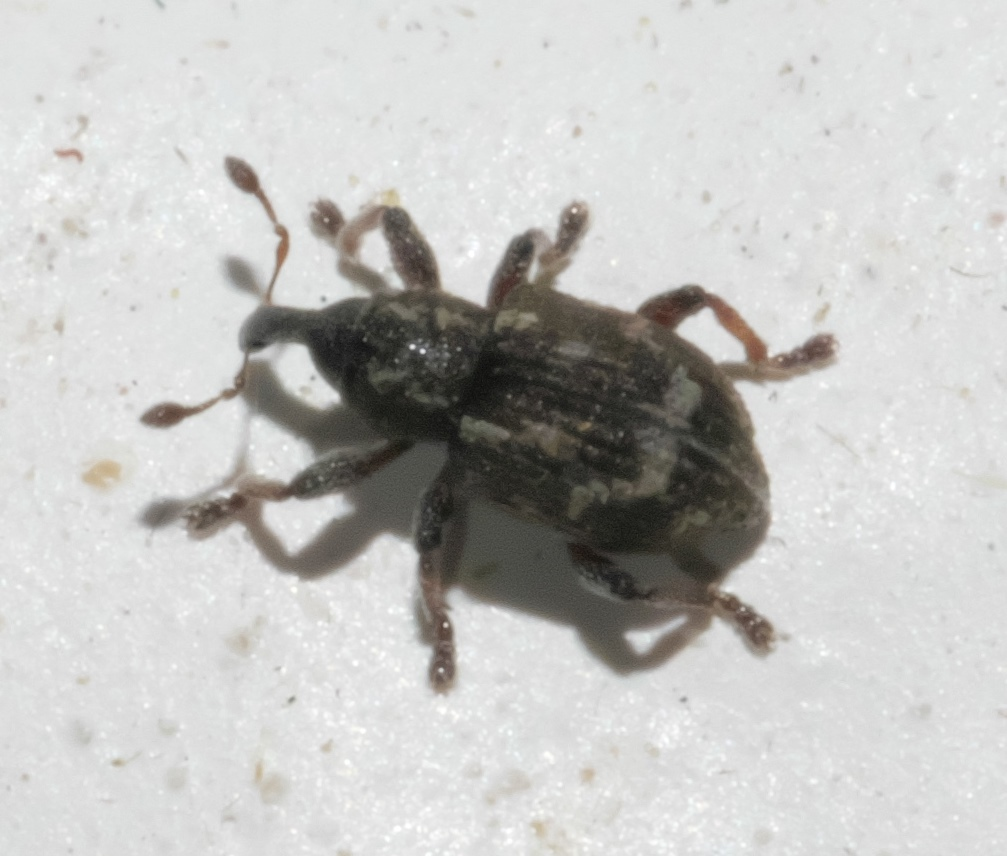
Tanysphyrus lemnae, Oklahoma

Tanysphyrus lemnae is a species of weevil native to Europe as well as North America; the larvae are leaf-miners in duckweed, genus Lemna.
