= Notiodes =

Scientific classification
- Domain: Eukaryota
- Kingdom: Animalia
- Phylum: Arthropoda
- Class: Insecta
- Order: Coleoptera
- Suborder: Polyphaga
- Infraorder: Cucujiformia
- Family: Erirhinidae
- Genus: Notiodes; Schönherr, 1838

Synonyms
- Endalus Laporte, 1840

Genus of beetles

Notiodes is a genus of marsh weevils in the beetle family Erirhinidae. There are about 16 described species in Notiodes.

Erirhinidae is sometimes considered a family, and sometimes treated as a subfamily, in which case Notoides is considered a member of the family Brachyceridae.

== Species ==
These 16 species belong to the genus Notiodes:

- Notiodes aeratus (LeConte, 1876)
- Notiodes apiculatus Schoenherr, 1843
- Notiodes celatus (Burke, 1961)
- Notiodes cribricollis (LeConte, 1876)
- Notiodes depressus (Burke, 1961)
- Notiodes disgregus (Burke, 1961)
- Notiodes egenus Schoenherr, 1843
- Notiodes laticollis (Blatchley, 1916)
- Notiodes limatulus (Gyllenhal, 1836)
- Notiodes nigrirostris Boheman, 1843
- Notiodes ovalis (LeConte, 1876)
- Notiodes pumilis (Burke, 1965)
- Notiodes punctatus (LeConte, 1876)
- Notiodes robustus (Schaeffer, 1908)
- Notiodes setosus (LeConte, 1876)
- Notiodes sporcarpius O'Brien, 2009
