= Bransby =

Hamlet in the West Lindsey district of Lincolnshire, England

Coordinates: 53.30°N 00.66°W

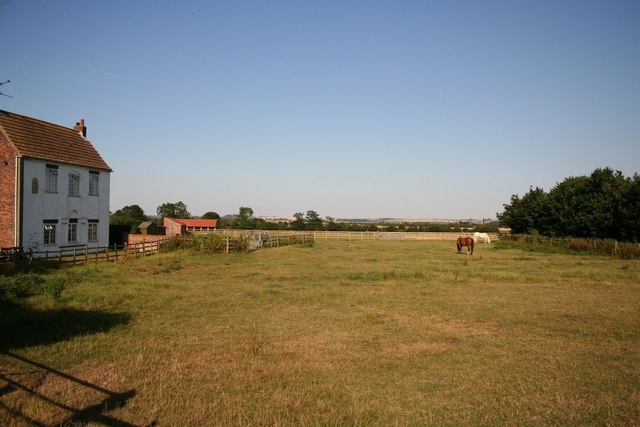

- Location within Lincolnshire
- OS grid reference: SK899790
  - London: 125 mi (201 km) S
- District: West Lindsey
- Shire county: Lincolnshire
- Region: East Midlands
- Country: England
- Sovereign state: United Kingdom
- Post town: Lincoln
- Postcode district: LN1
- Police: Lincolnshire
- Fire: Lincolnshire
- Ambulance: East Midlands

Bransby is a hamlet in the West Lindsey district of Lincolnshire, England. It is situated approximately 7 miles (11 km) north-west from the city and county town of Lincoln, 9 miles (14 km) south-east from Gainsborough, and 0.5 miles (0.8 km) from both the A1500 Roman road to the north, and the B1241 to the west.

Bransby is a single-street village bounded by cottages and farms.

The River Till flows past the village 400 yards (366 m) to the east.

== History ==
Bransby is documented in the Doomsday Book of 1086 as "Branzbi". Archaeological evidence suggests there may have been a green or common in the past, as well as medieval earthworks, possibly a pond.

== Amenities ==
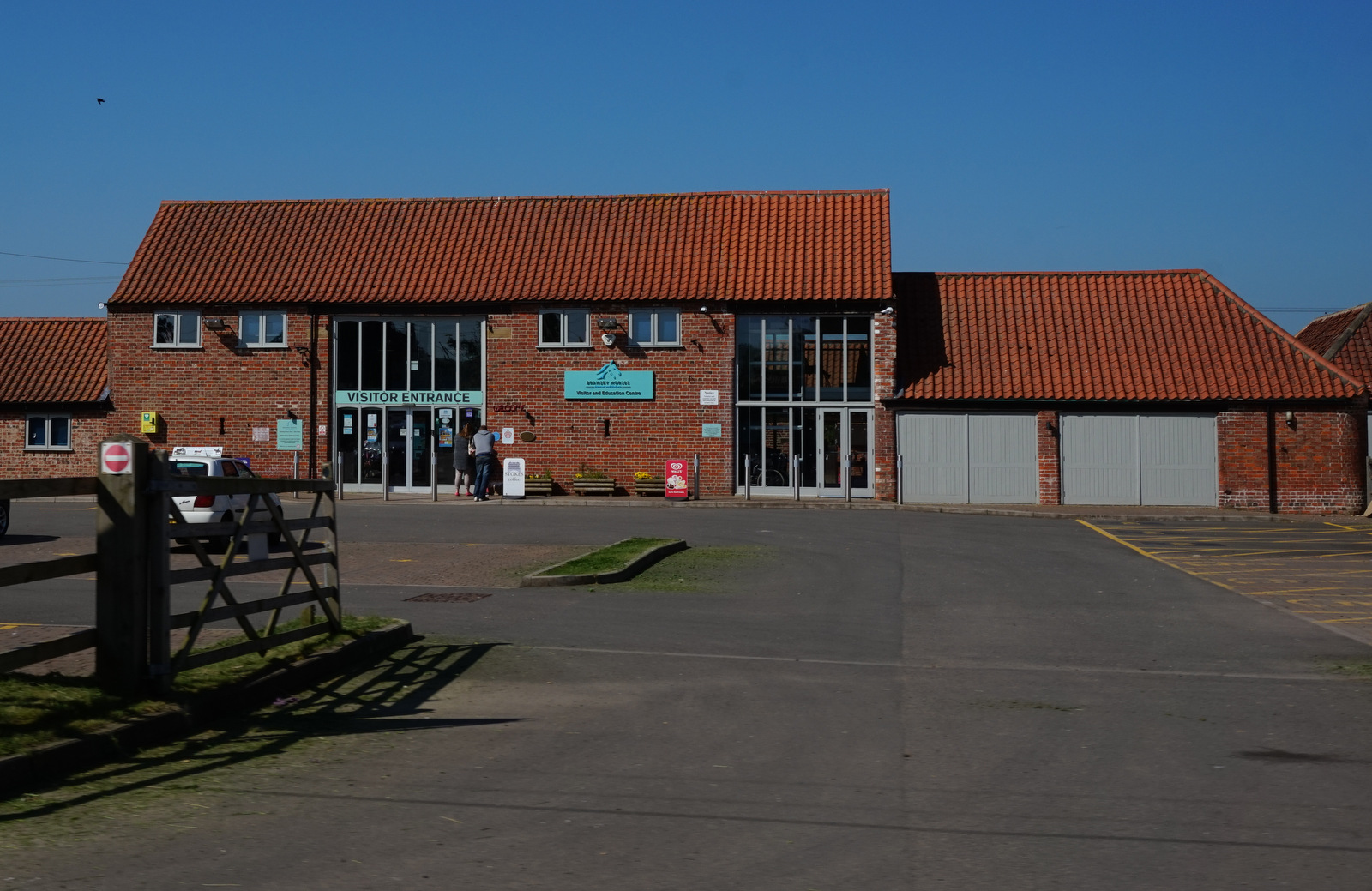
Bransby Horses

Bransby is home to Bransby Horses Rescue and Welfare, one of the UK's largest equine welfare sanctuaries. The charity was founded by Peter Hunt in 1968.
