= Tanysphyrus major =

Scientific classification
- Kingdom: Animalia
- Phylum: Arthropoda
- Clade: Pancrustacea
- Class: Insecta
- Order: Coleoptera
- Suborder: Polyphaga
- Infraorder: Cucujiformia
- Family: Brachyceridae
- Genus: Tanysphyrus
- Species: T. major

Binomial name
- Tanysphyrus major Roelofs, 1874

Species of beetle

Tanysphyrus major is a species of weevils of the subfamily Brachycerinae.

== Distribution ==
On the territory of Russia is distributed in the south of Sakhalin Oblast and on the southern Kuril Islands. It is also found in Japan, on the islands Honshu Shikoku and Hokkaido, south-east of China and on the island of Java.

== Description ==
Rostrum of male and female from the base is uniformly curved, and is longer than prothorax (especially in females). The second segment of the flagellum of the male is, which is two times shorter than the first, third to sixth segments of the square. The pronotum is wider in the middle. Elytron with have a steep slope.

== Ecology ==
On the island of Kunashir the larva of the species eat leaf miners on leaves of Lysichiton camtschatcensis of swampy lowland, and raw meadows and under the canopy along streams.
