= Gate Burton =

, is a village and civil parish in the West Lindsey district of Lincolnshire, England

Coordinates: 53.334038°N 0.744164°W

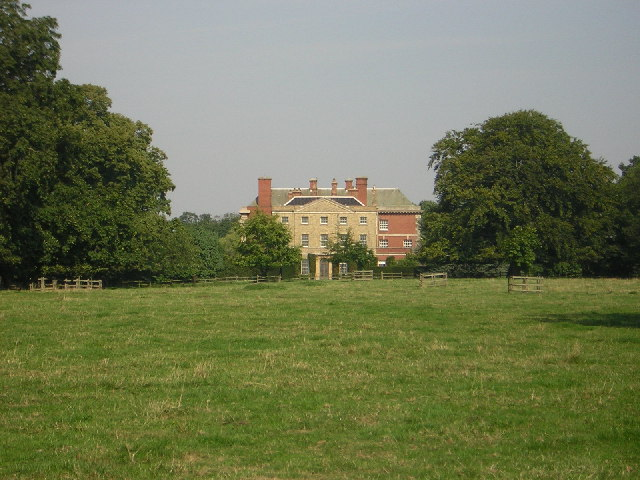
- Gate Burton Hall

- Location within Lincolnshire
- OS grid reference: SK837826
  - London: 125 mi (201 km) S
- District: West Lindsey
- Shire county: Lincolnshire
- Region: East Midlands
- Country: England
- Sovereign state: United Kingdom
- Post town: Gainsborough
- Postcode district: DN21
- Police: Lincolnshire
- Fire: Lincolnshire
- Ambulance: East Midlands
- UK Parliament: Gainsborough

Gate Burton (sometimes called Burton Gate), is a village and civil parish in the West Lindsey district of Lincolnshire, England. It is situated 4 miles (6.4 km) south from the town of Gainsborough. The population is listed under the civil parish of Marton.

There are earthworks which are the remains of the medieval village. There were two manors at Gate Burton at the time of the Domesday Book which were held in 1086 by Count Alan of Brittany. By the 13th century Gate Burton was held by the Trehampton family along with their manor of Lea, and both Lea and Gate Burton belonged to Lord Burgh of Gainsborough in the 16th century. It was sold around 1739 to the Hutton family, and William Huttons house of 1774-80 forms the core of the present Gate Burton Hall.

The present Saint Helen's Church is at least the third on the site. In 1741 the chancel of the first St Helens church was in ruins and in 1784 a petition was put forward to demolish and rebuild the whole church. The replacement was built at the Hutton family's expense prior to 1793. It was replaced again by the existing limestone building of 1866, which is a Grade II listed building.

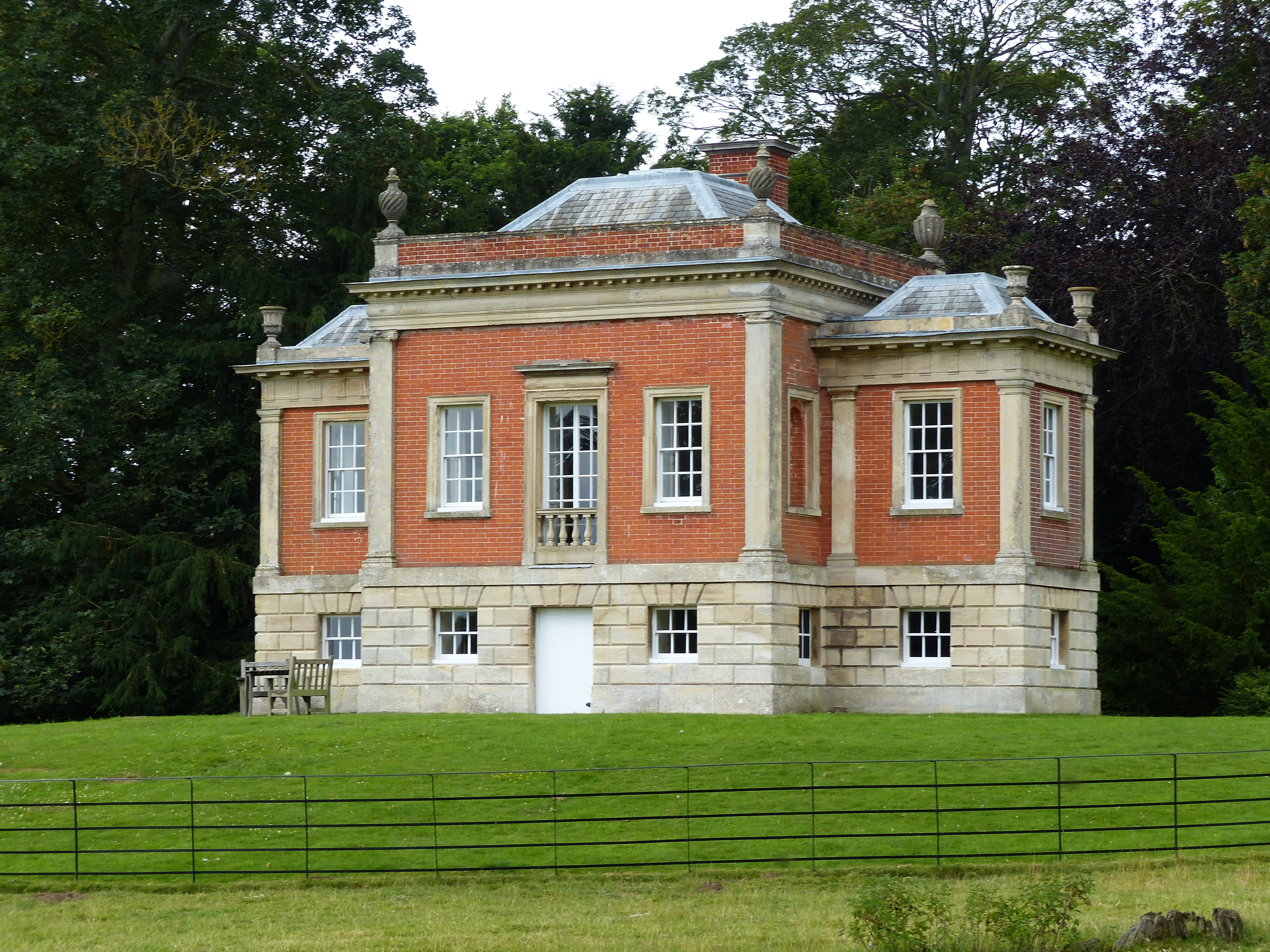
Gate Burton Chateau

Gate Burton Hall was built around 1770–84, for the Hutton family, with later additions and alterations. It is now two residences, and is Grade II* listed. In the grounds of Gate Burton Hall the temple folly in red brick and limestone, known as Burton Chateau, was built earlier in 1747 by James Paine, and it too is Grade II* listed. It is a Landmark Trust property that is available for holiday lets.

== Notable people ==
- Frederick Wollaston Hutton FRS (1836–1905), scientist who applied the theory of natural selection to the natural history of New Zealand
