= Lea, Lincolnshire =

Village in Lincolnshire, England

Coordinates: 53.370056°N 0.75492°W

Lea
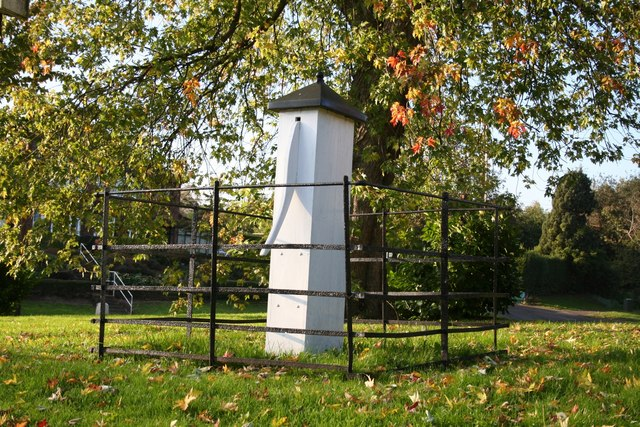
- Lea village pump.

- Location within Lincolnshire
- Population: 1,009 (2011)
- OS grid reference: SK829866
  - London: 135 mi (217 km) S
- District: West Lindsey
- Shire county: Lincolnshire
- Region: East Midlands
- Country: England
- Sovereign state: United Kingdom
- Post town: Gainsborough
- Postcode district: DN21
- Dialling code: 01427
- Police: Lincolnshire
- Fire: Lincolnshire
- Ambulance: East Midlands
- UK Parliament: Gainsborough

Lea is a small village and civil parish in the West Lindsey district of Lincolnshire, England. The population of the civil parish at the 2011 census was 1,009. It is at the junction of the A156 and B1241, approximately 2.5 miles (4 km) south from Gainsborough town centre.

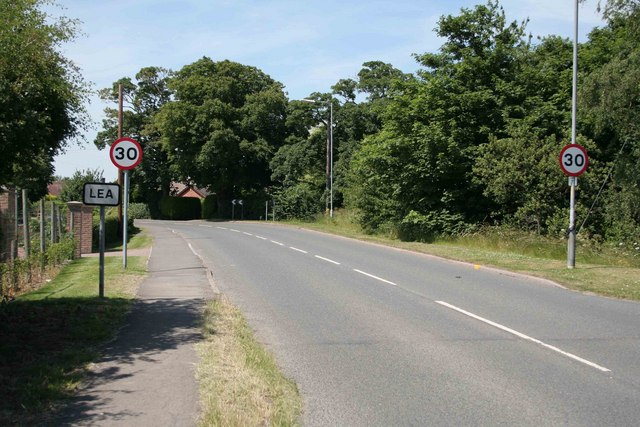
Lea village

Lea has a village hall, the Lea Institute, and a park with tennis court. There are no shops in the village, the nearest being a supermarket and filling station 1.5 miles (2.4 km) away at Gainsborough.

The primary school is the Frances Olive Anderson School. The school was established by Lady Anderson in about 1814, and the current building was built as a Church of England (Aided) school in 1966. Extra classrooms were added in 1971.

The parish church is dedicated to St Helen. It is one of seven churches in the Lea group of the Deanery of Corringham in the Diocese of Lincoln. There is also a Methodist Chapel, part of the Gainsborough circuit.

The nearest railway station is Gainsborough Lea Road on the Sheffield to Lincoln Line, with services to Lincoln, Sheffield, Retford and Doncaster. Lea is on a bus route, provided by Stagecoach, that runs from Scunthorpe to Lincoln.
