= St Botolph's Church, Saxilby =

Church in Lincolnshire, England

St Botolph's Church
- St Botolph's Church, Saxilby
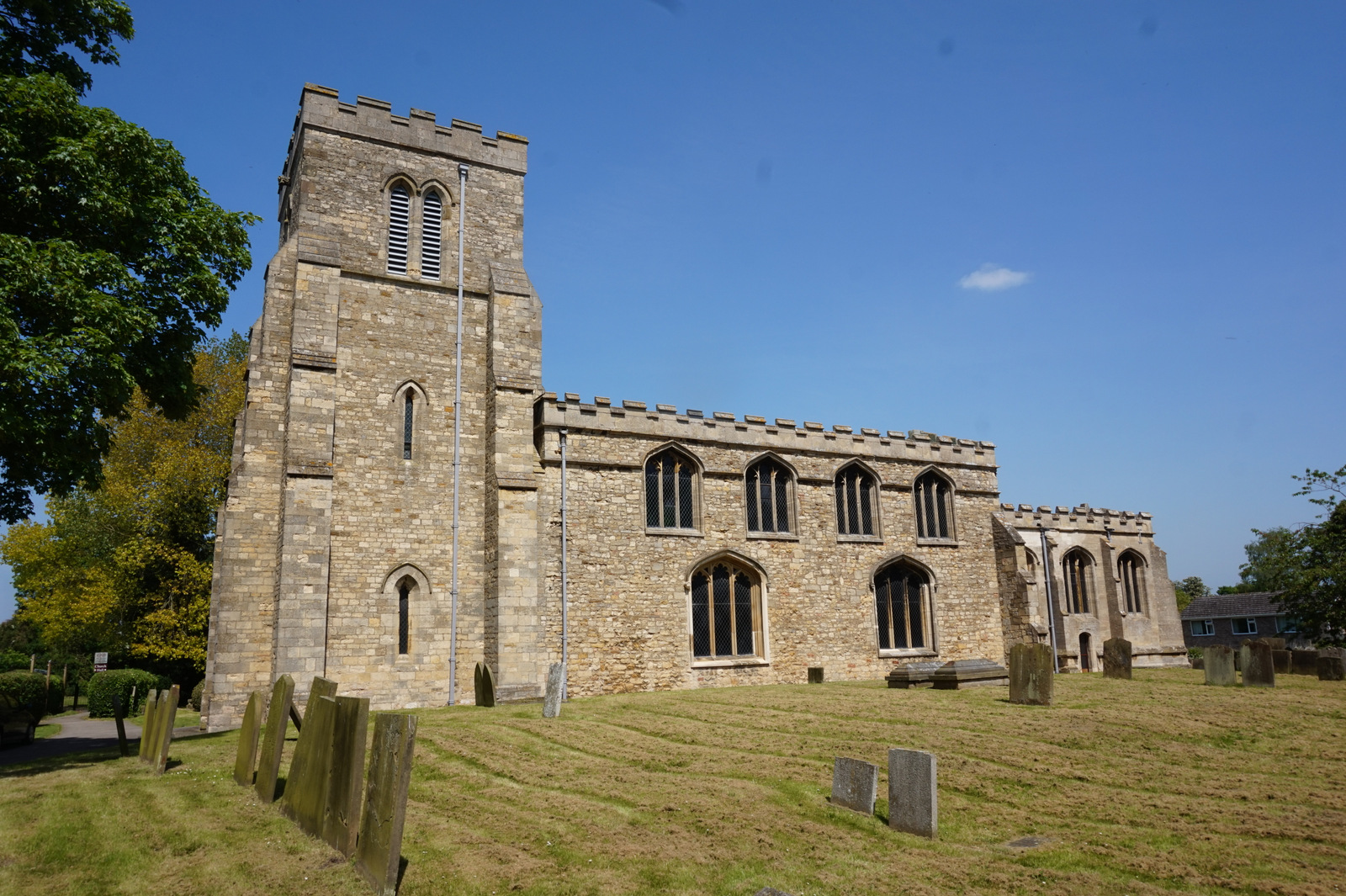
- St Botolph's Church, Saxilby
- St Botolph's Church
- 53.274797°N 0.659147°W
- OS grid reference: SK 89514 76151
- Country: England
- Denomination: Church of England
- Website: www.saxilbyparishchurch.co.uk

History
- Status: Active

Architecture
- Functional status: Active
- Heritage designation: Grade I listed
- Designated: November 1966

Administration
- Diocese: Diocese of Lincoln
- Parish: Saxilby with Ingleby

St Botolph's Church, Saxilby, Lincolnshire, England, is an active parish church in the Church of England. Located off Church Lane to the north of the village centre, it is a Grade I listed building.

== History and description ==
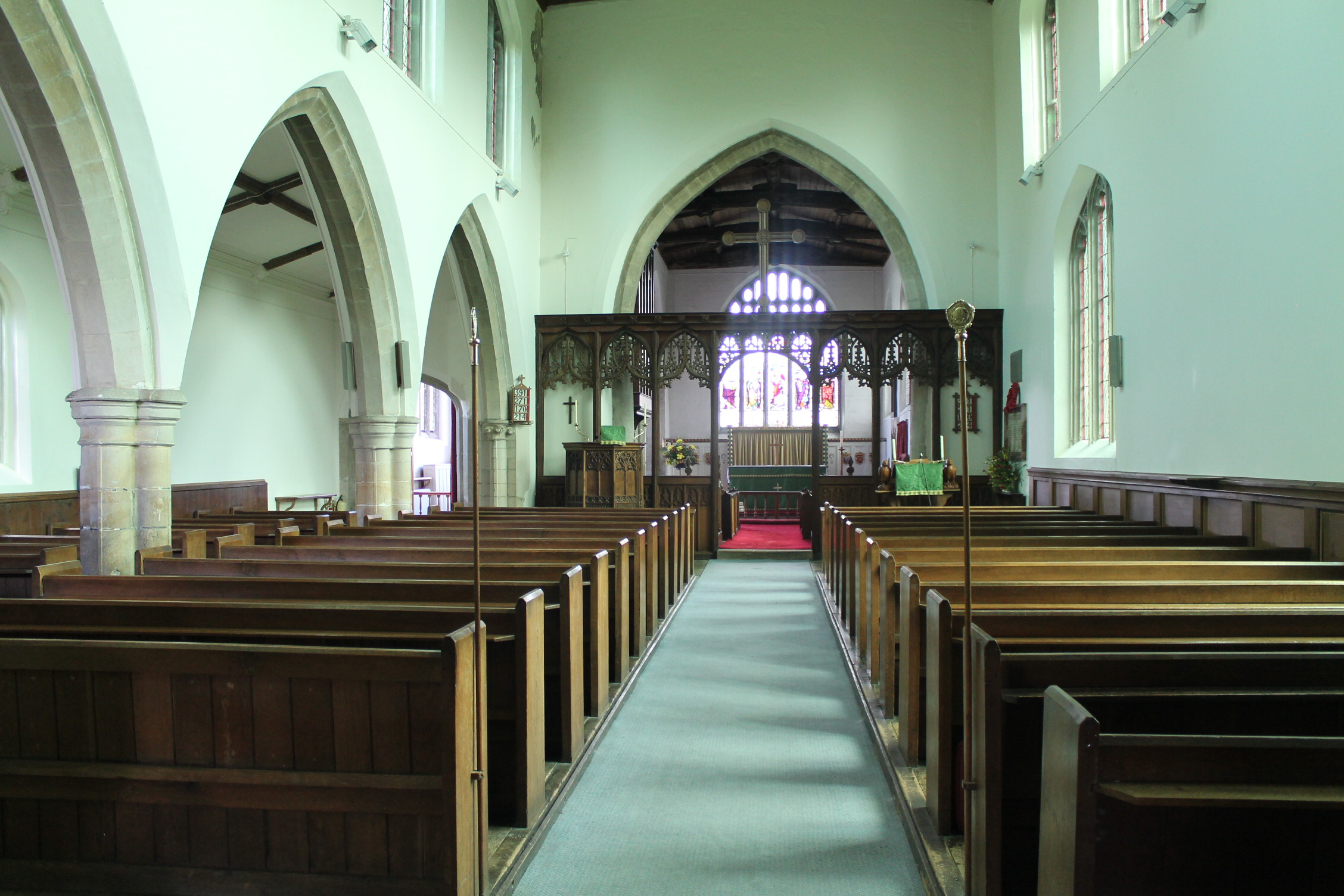
St Botolph's interior

The church was built in the twelfth century and underwent alterations to the interior and exterior in the thirteenth and fifteenth centuries. It was restored in 1819 and again in 1908. Nicholas Antram, in his revised Lincolnshire volume in the Pevsner Buildings of England series, notes the range of architectural styles evident: from the Norman north door, through the Early English Gothic of the arcade to later Decorated and Perpendicular elements. The interior contains an important funerary monument depicting a knight and his wife and dating from about 1370.

St Bodolph's remains an active church holding regular services, weddings, and community events.

== Sources ==
- Pevsner, Nikolaus; Harris, John; Antram, Nicholas (2002). Lincolnshire. The Buildings of England. New Haven, US and London: Yale University Press. ISBN 0-300-09620-8.
