= Marton, Lincolnshire =

Village in Lincolnshire, England

Coordinates: 53.3276°N 0.7403°W

Marton
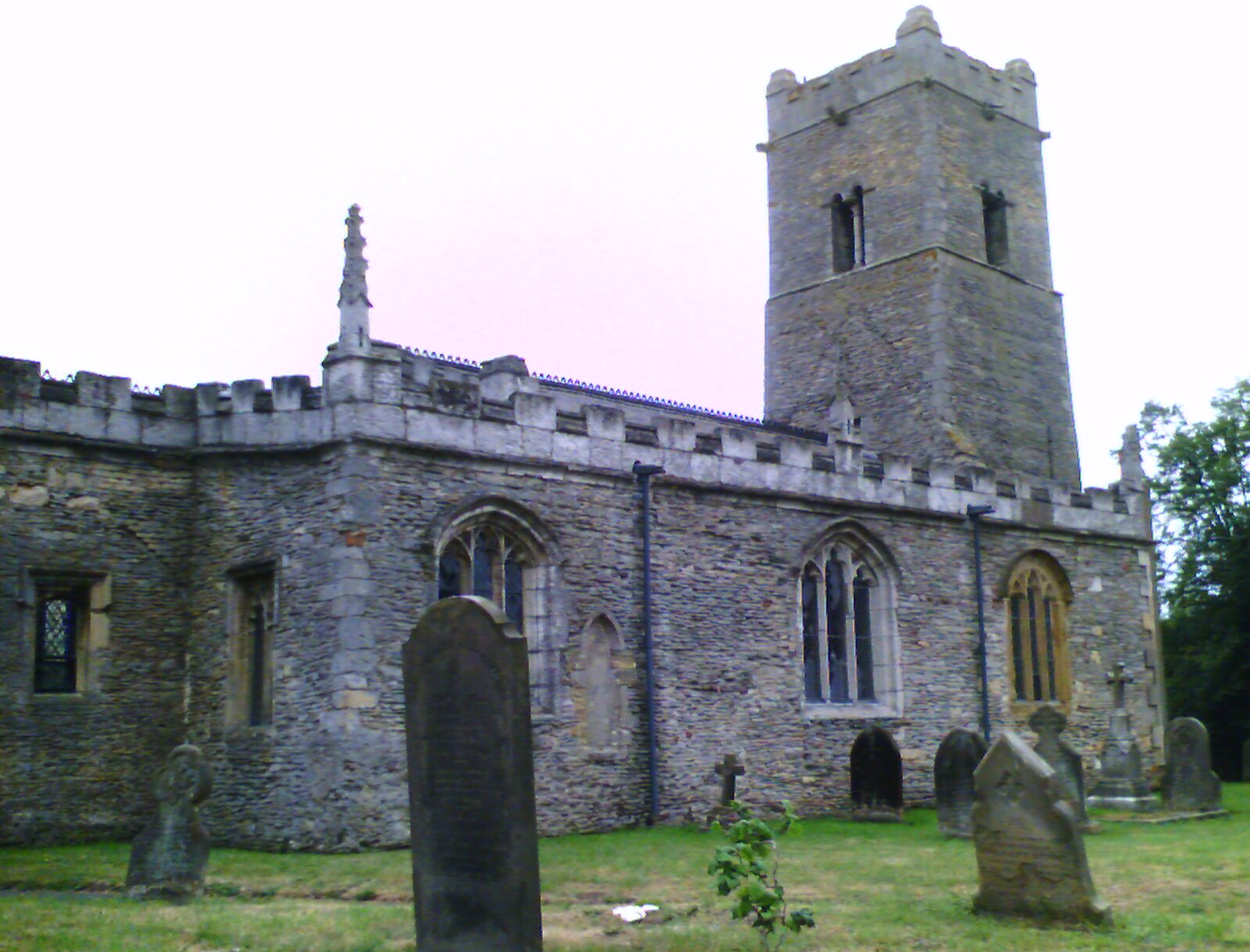
- St Margaret's Church, Marton

- Location within Lincolnshire
- Population: 747 (2011)
- OS grid reference: SK839819
  - London: 125 mi (201 km) S
- District: West Lindsey
- Shire county: Lincolnshire
- Region: East Midlands
- Country: England
- Sovereign state: United Kingdom
- Post town: Gainsborough
- Postcode district: DN21
- Dialling code: 01427
- Police: Lincolnshire
- Fire: Lincolnshire
- Ambulance: East Midlands
- UK Parliament: Gainsborough

Marton is a village and civil parish in the West Lindsey district of Lincolnshire, England. It is situated at the junction between the A156 and the A1500. It is 5 miles (8 km) south of Gainsborough, and 11 miles (18 km) north-west of Lincoln. The population of the civil parish (including Gate Burton) was 747 at the 2011 census. The parish borders Brampton, Gate Burton, Sturton by Stow, North Leverton with Habblesthorpe, Cottam, Sturton-le-Steeple and Willingham.

== History ==
In Roman times, it was a way station, slightly north of the larger fort at Torksey, the point just before the Roman road crossed the River Trent. The modern A156 road crosses the ancient Roman road (now the A1500) mentioned in the Antonine Itinerary. Erasmus Darwin, the grandfather of Charles Darwin, descended from a yeoman family who lived for a number of generations at Marton.

In the centre of the village stands the church of St Margaret. The building is essentially of the Norman Conquest period, built using a mixture of Anglo-Saxon and Norman styles. Much of the work of these periods is still retained. It has an 11th-century tower of herringbone masonry, a Saxon cross shaft set in an outer wall and an ancient carved crucifix within. It is listed on the National Heritage List for England as a Grade I Listed Building. The tall cross in the churchyard is used as a war memorial and it is thought to be a former Medieval market buttercross.

== Education ==
The village has a primary school, the Marton Academy, which was named the winner of the Ashden Sustainable Schools Award in 2015 for its sustainability efforts, which included the installation of solar panels on the roof of a classroom.

== Gallery ==
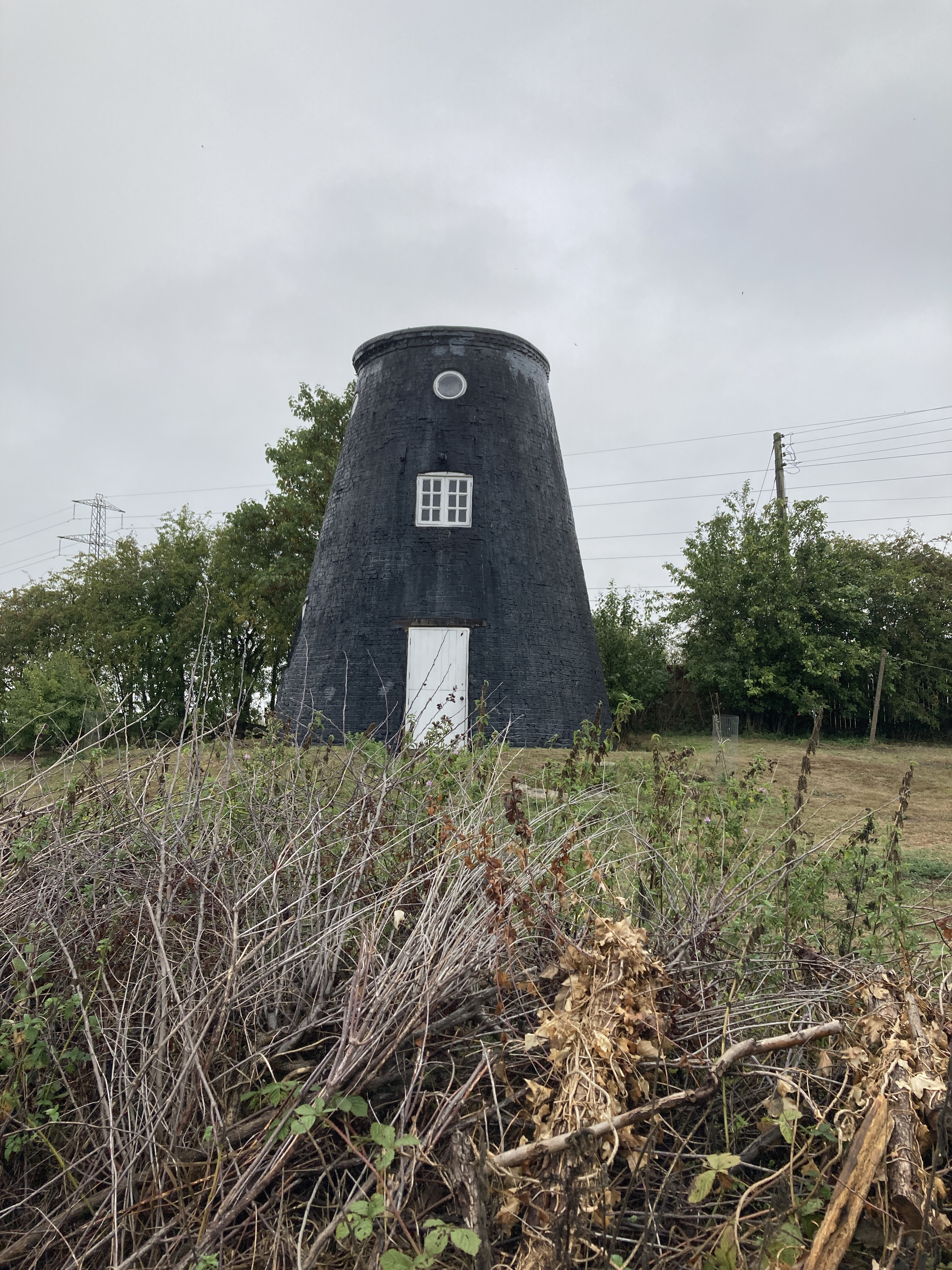
The former windmill at Trent Port, Marton, Lincolnshire

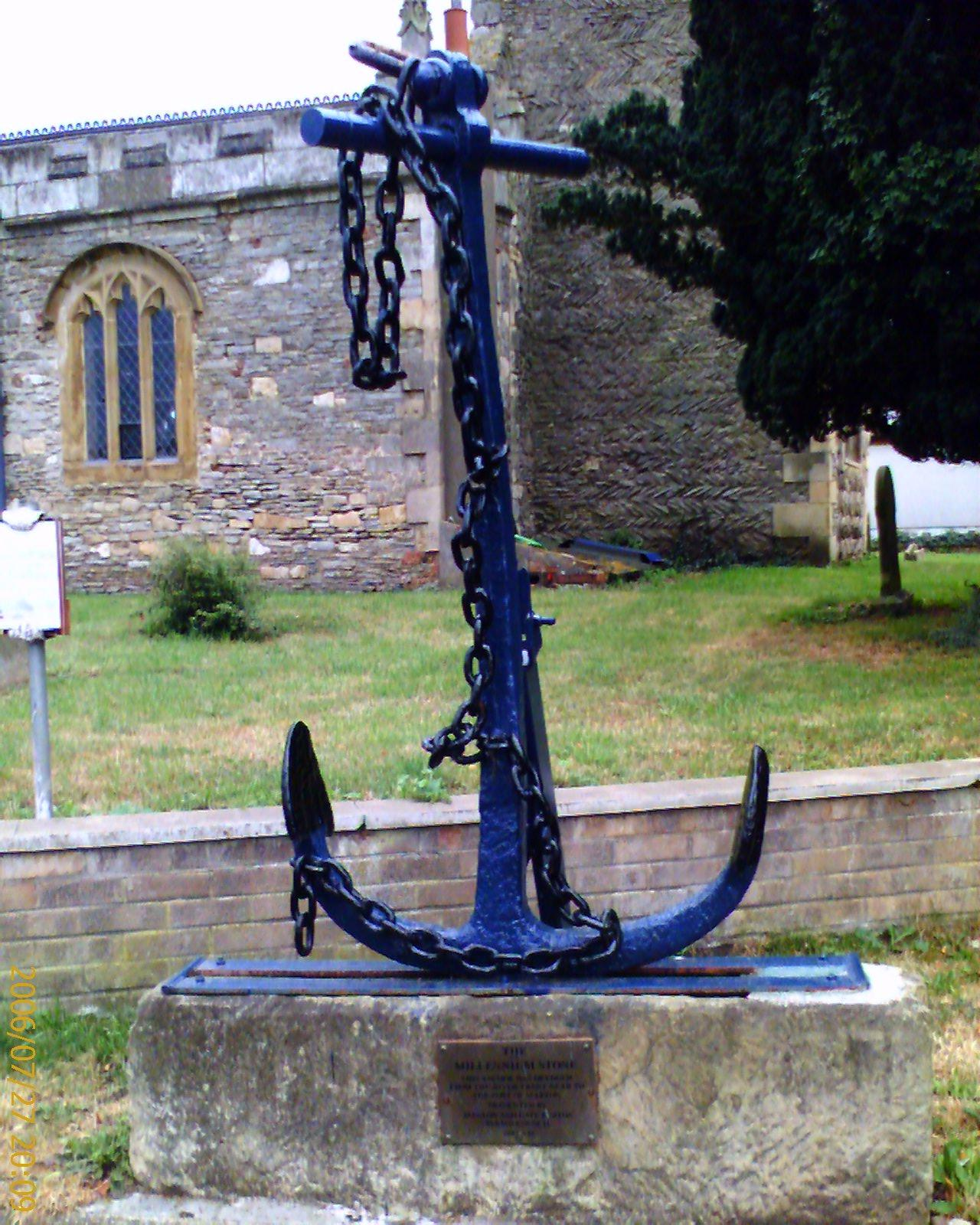
The Millennium Stone at Marton

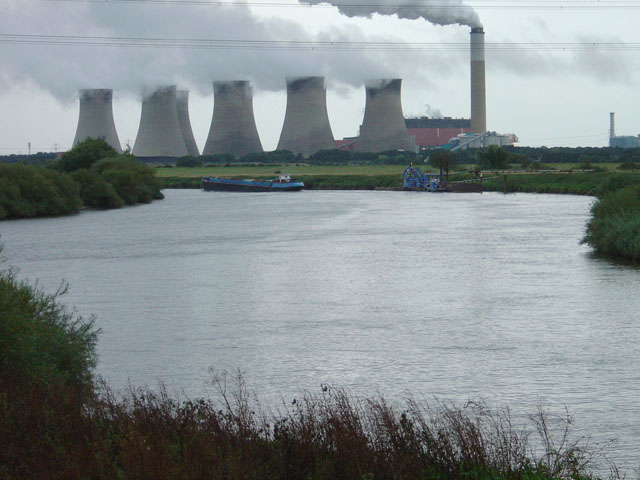
The river Trent at Marton
