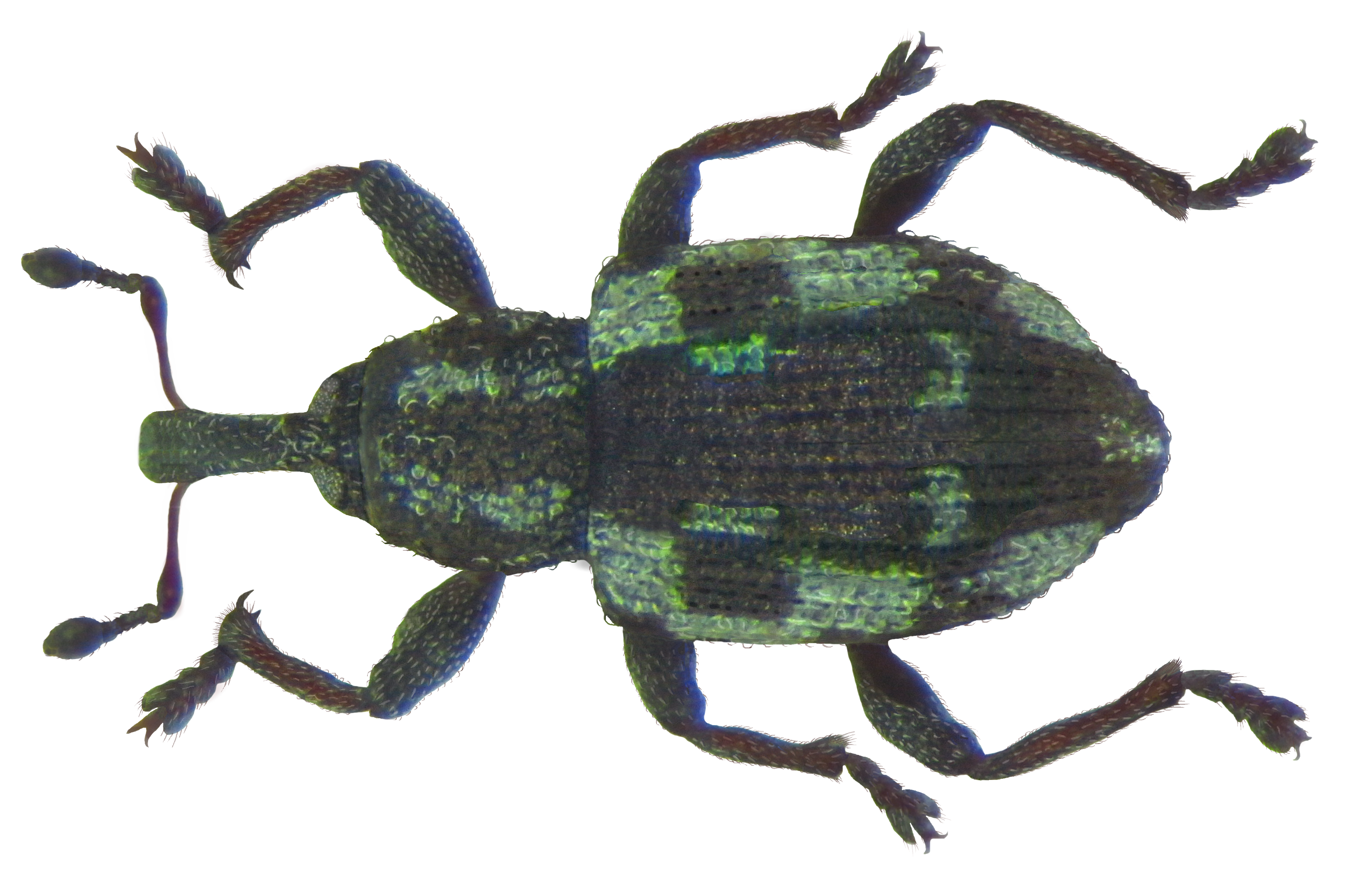
- Tanysphyrus lemnae

Scientific classification
- Domain: Eukaryota
- Kingdom: Animalia
- Phylum: Arthropoda
- Class: Insecta
- Order: Coleoptera
- Suborder: Polyphaga
- Infraorder: Cucujiformia
- Family: Brachyceridae
- Genus: Tanysphyrus; Germar, 1817

= Tanysphyrus =

Genus of beetles

Tanysphyrus is a genus of beetles belonging to the family Brachyceridae.

The species of this genus are found in Europe, Japan and America.

Selected species:

- Tanysphyrus ater Blatchley, 1928
- Tanysphyrus atra Blatchley, 1928
- Tanysphyrus lemnae (Paykull & G.de, 1792)
- Tanysphyrus major Roelofs, 1874
