= Owmby-by-Spital =

Village and civil parish in the West Lindsey district of Lincolnshire, England

Coordinates: 53.374680°N 0.496835°W

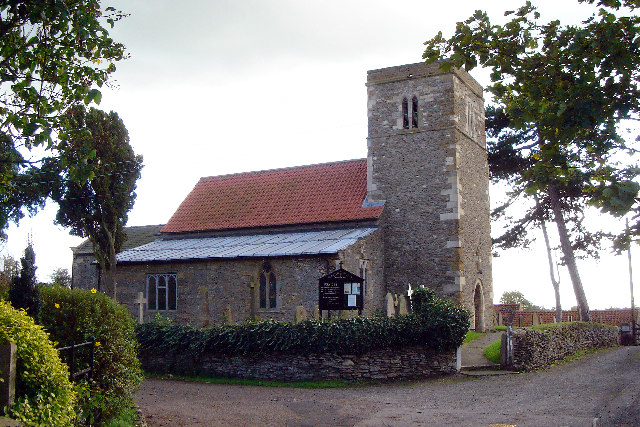
- Owmby church

- Location within Lincolnshire
- Population: 388 (2011)
- OS grid reference: TF001874
  - London: 135 mi (217 km) S
- Civil parish: Owmby-by-Spital
- District: West Lindsey
- Shire county: Lincolnshire
- Region: East Midlands
- Country: England
- Sovereign state: United Kingdom
- Post town: MARKET RASEN
- Postcode district: LN8
- Police: Lincolnshire
- Fire: Lincolnshire
- Ambulance: East Midlands
- UK Parliament: Gainsborough

Owmby-by-Spital is a village and civil parish in the West Lindsey district of Lincolnshire, England. It is situated 2 miles (3 km) east from the A15 road, 11 miles (18 km) north from Lincoln and 8 miles (13 km) west from Market Rasen. The population of the civil parish (just called Owmby then) was 388 at the 2011 census. The village is part of the Owmby Group of parishes.

Owmby-by-Spital is listed in 6 entries of the Domesday Book as 'Ouneby', in the Aslacoe wapentake, in the West Riding of Lindsey. The largest holder in 1066 and 1086 being the Bishop of Lincoln (St Mary). Other land holders in 1086 include Bishop Odo of Bayeux, Ivo Tallboys (Taillebois), and Jocelyn, (son of Lambert).

The civil parish covers an area of 1,600 acres (6.5 km^{2}). According to the 2001 Census it had a population of 309.

The designation of "Spital" in the name comes from the proximity to the village of Spital-in-the-Street.

The village church is dedicated to St Peter and St Paul. Kelly's noted that the church was built in 1808, with parts of the structure Norman, and that it seated 200 people.

A school was built in 1836, by 1881 Owmby school had closed.

== Notable people ==
Bernie Taupin, English lyricist noted for his collaboration with Elton John, grew up in the village.
