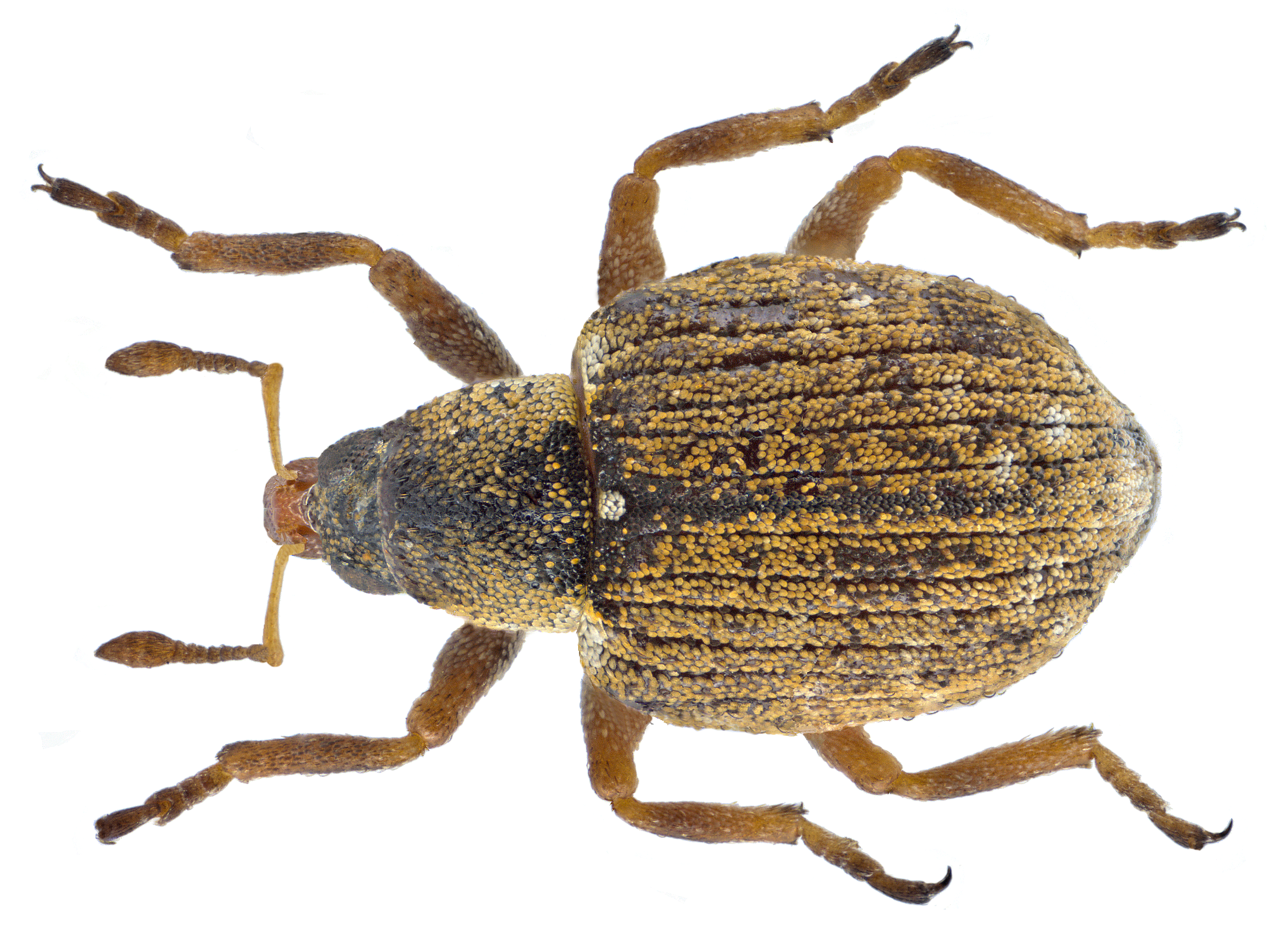
- Stenopelmus rufinasus

Scientific classification
- Domain: Eukaryota
- Kingdom: Animalia
- Phylum: Arthropoda
- Class: Insecta
- Order: Coleoptera
- Suborder: Polyphaga
- Infraorder: Cucujiformia
- Family: Brachyceridae
- Subfamily: Erirhininae
- Genus: Stenopelmus; Schönherr, 1835

= Stenopelmus =

Genus of beetles

Stenopelmus is a genus of marsh weevils in the beetle family Brachyceridae. There are at least two described species in Stenopelmus.

== Species ==
These two species belong to the genus Stenopelmus:

- Stenopelmus brunneus Hustache, 1926
- Stenopelmus rufinasus Gyllenhal, 1836 (water fern weevil)
