= A1500 road =

Road in Lincolnshire, England

A1500

Route information
- Length: 8.6 mi (13.8 km)

Major junctions
- From: Marton 53.3284°N 0.7404°W
- A156; A15
- To: Scampton 53.291°N 0.5422°W

Location
- Country: United Kingdom
- Constituent country: England
- Primary destinations: Sturton by Stow

Road network
- Roads in the United Kingdom; Motorways; A and B road zones

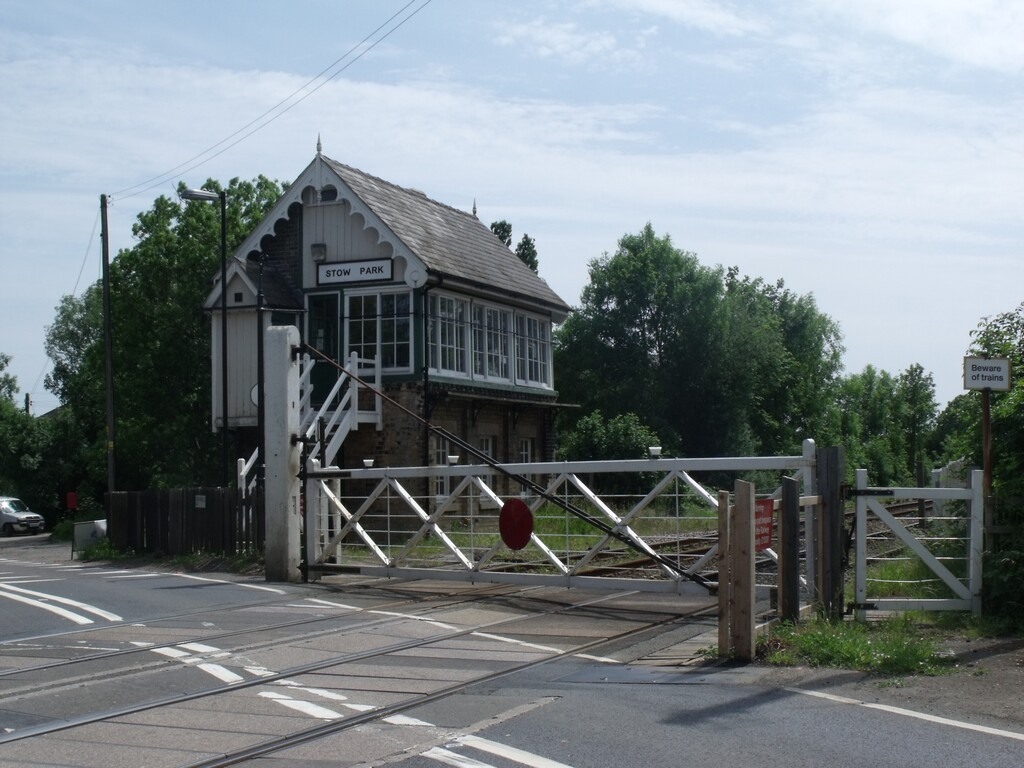
Stow Park level crossing

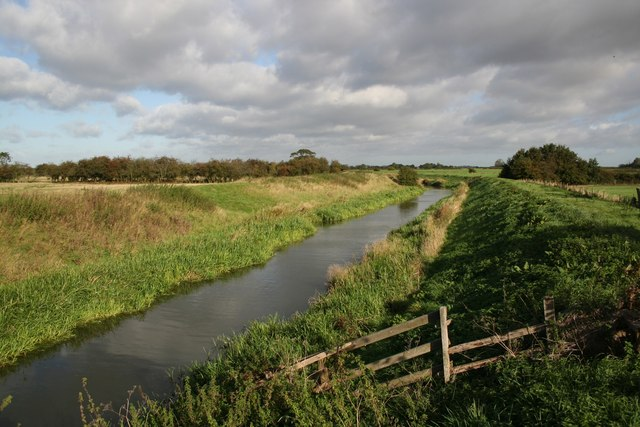
The River Till photographed from the Till Bridge on the A1500

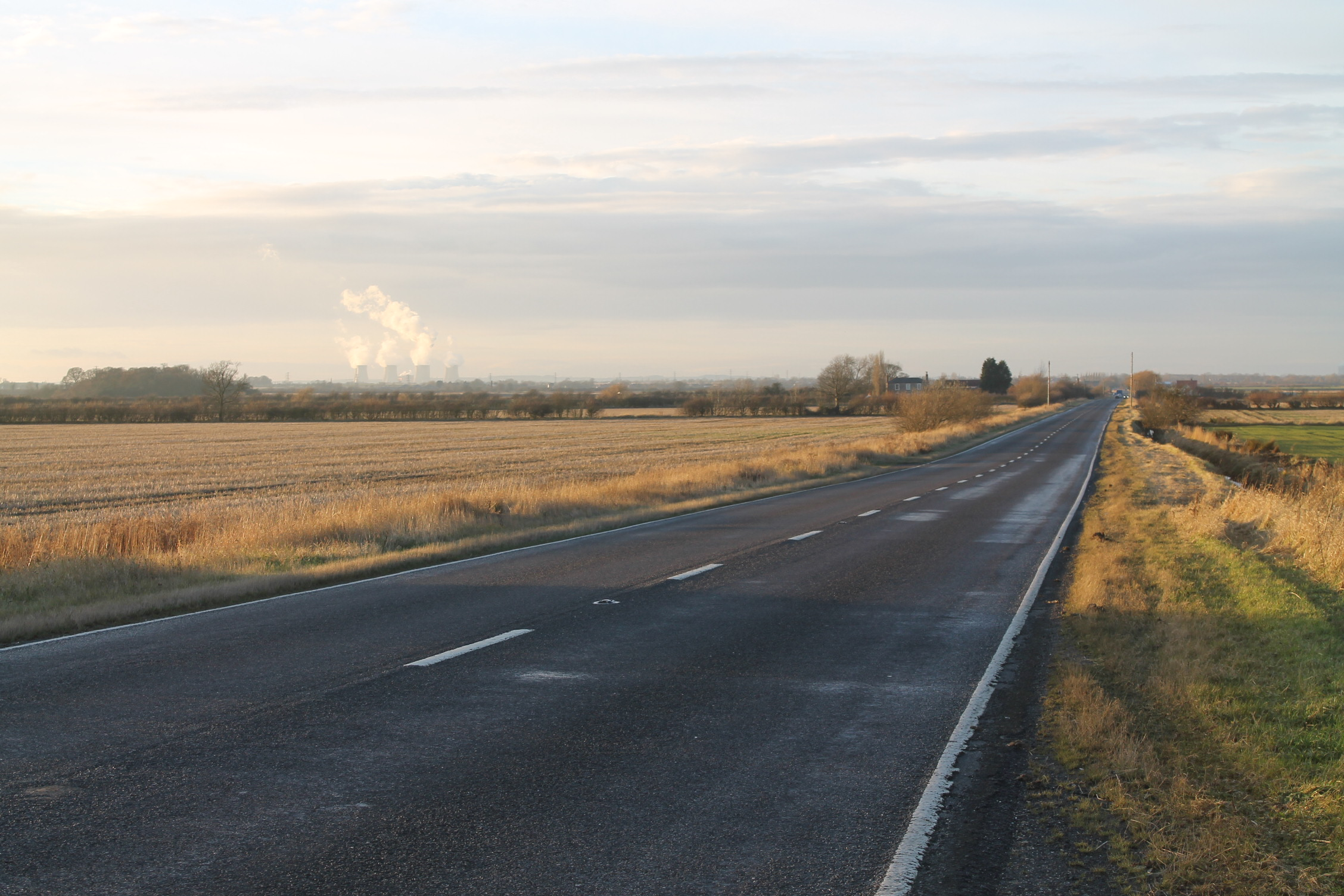
Till Bridge Lane

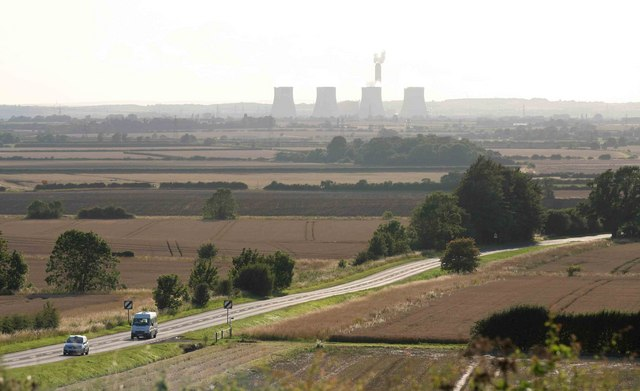
The A1500 south of Scampton

The A1500 is an A road entirely within the English county of Lincolnshire. It links the A156 at Marton with the A15 south of RAF Scampton via Sturton by Stow.

The A1500 follows the Roman road Till Bridge Lane and at the very end at Scampton, Horncastle Lane. This Roman Road was part of the Alternative route from Lincoln to York used when the Humber was impassable, and is thus associated with Ermine Street in the Antonine Itinerary.

== Route ==
The A1500 starts in the village of Marton, at SK840820, and runs south of east along the Roman alignment. The junction in the Village is actually a crossroads: The Roman alignment is maintained toward the west, crosses the River Trent to Littleborough, Nottinghamshire, and can be intermittently discovered nearly to Bawtry. (None of this is part of the A1500.)

The A1500 follows the Roman Road through Sturton by Stow at SK890803, crosses the River Till by Till Bridge Farm at SK908797, until SK947784 near Scampton village. From here the modern road deviates almost due east, and ends at SK973781, the junction with the modern A15, Roman Ermine Street, south of RAF Scampton.

The whole length along the Roman Road is known as Till Bridge Lane. The section from the deviation at SK947784 to the roundabout on the A15 is named Horncastle Lane. The name Horncastle Lane continues on the other side of the A15, but that is a minor road not part of the A1500 designation.

The A1500 is single carriageway throughout.

The Roman Road alignment from SK947784 near Scampton is maintained across fields, and also makes a junction with the A15 Ermine Street at SK973774. This is the main entrance to the Lincolnshire Showground, which is based around the Roman Road.

== See also ==
- List of A roads in Zone 1 of the Great Britain numbering scheme
- Ermine Street
