= Saxilby =

Village in Lincolnshire, England

Coordinates: 53.271434°N 0.655977°W

- Village and Civil Parish
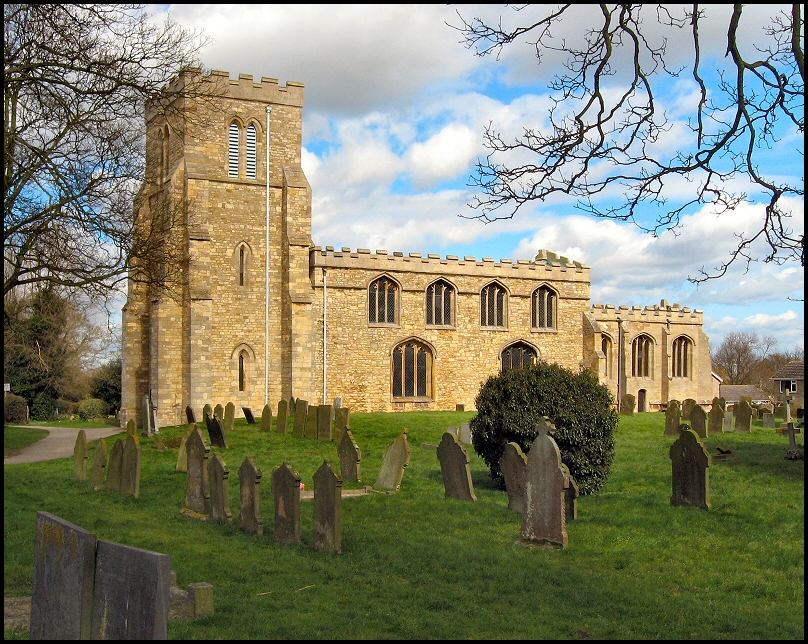
- St Botolph's Church, Saxilby

- Location within Lincolnshire
- Population: 4,428 (2021)
- OS grid reference: SK897757
  - London: 125 mi (201 km) S
- Civil parish: Saxilby with Ingleby
- District: West Lindsey
- Shire county: Lincolnshire
- Region: East Midlands
- Country: England
- Sovereign state: United Kingdom
- Post town: LINCOLN
- Postcode district: LN1
- Dialling code: 01522
- Police: Lincolnshire
- Fire: Lincolnshire
- Ambulance: East Midlands
- UK Parliament: Gainsborough

Saxilby is a village and civil parish in the West Lindsey district of Lincolnshire, England, about 6 miles (9.7 km) north-west from Lincoln, on the A57 road at the junction of the B1241. It is part of the civil parish of Saxilby and Ingleby, which includes the village of Ingleby. The population of the civil parish in 2001 was 3,679, increasing to 3,992 at the 2011 census.

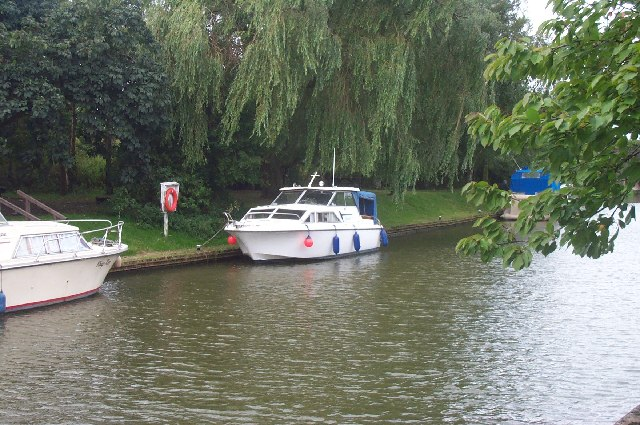
Boats moored on the Fossdyke as it runs through Saxilby

The village lies on the north bank of the Foss Dyke.

The name is of Viking origin, Old Norse Saksúlfr + byr, or "farmstead of a man called Saksulfr" and it appears as "Saxebi" in the Domesday Book of 1086. In archived documents the village is often referred to as "Saxelby", with the current spelling of Saxilby only being found in common use from the late 19th century onwards.

== History ==
The Foss Dyke, which runs through Saxilby, may date back to Roman times. Whether they settled at the site is unknown, although Roman pottery has been found nearby. During the 9th century, Viking invaders took many areas of Lincolnshire and some settled in Saxilby. In the 12th century the Normans began creating Manors, and the Manor in the Saxilby area was given to Odo of Bayeux, half-brother of William the Conqueror.

== Local government and public services ==
Saxilby with Ingleby Parish Council is made up of fourteen councillors. The Saxilby Ward of West Lindsey District Council has two seats.

Saxilby falls is in Gainsborough parliamentary constituency, and the current MP is Sir Edward Leigh.

Policing is the responsibility of the Lincolnshire Police. Fire-fighting is the responsibility of the Lincolnshire Fire and Rescue Service, and the village has a Community Fire Station staffed by on-call firefighters.

The village is served by the East Midlands Ambulance Service (EMAS). The closest hospital is Lincoln County Hospital, which includes a 24-hour accident and emergency department. The John Coupland Hospital in Gainsborough has a limited hours Urgent Treatment Centre.

Saxilby has two medical practices and a veterinary practice.

== Transport ==
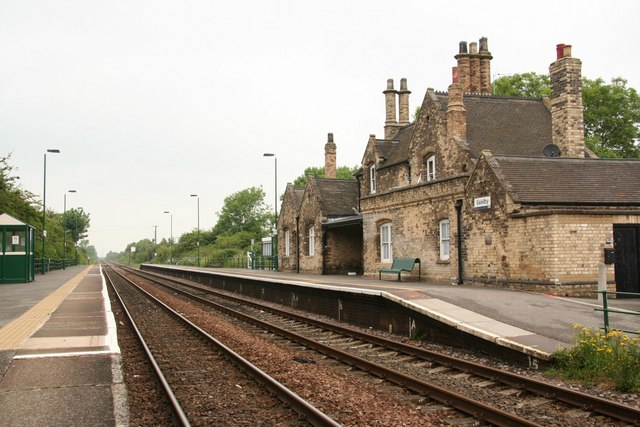
Saxilby railway station in 2008

Saxilby is situated next to the A57, which runs from Liverpool to Lincoln The B1241 road runs through the village, called Mill Lane from the A57 junction until it meets Church Road where it becomes Sturton Road.

The 700-yard A57 bypass, which replaced a level crossing, was opened on Wednesday September 15 1937, by Lord Heneage.

=== Bus ===
Saxilby is served by a number of bus routes:

- 100 – Lincoln to Scunthorpe via Gainsborough
- 105, 107 – Lincoln to Gainsborough
- 106 – Lincoln to Gainsborough via Saxilby
- 77 – Lincoln to Saxilby

The 77 Service is operated by PC Coaches of Lincoln and the remainder of the bus routes are operated by Stagecoach PLC.

=== Railway ===
Saxilby railway station, on the Doncaster to Lincoln Line, is situated close to the centre of the village, having originally been built by the Great Northern and Great Eastern Joint Railway. Train services are provided by Northern Rail which provides trains running between Lincoln, Sheffield, and Leeds. East Midlands Railways provides a train service running between Doncaster and Lincoln. Connections to the East Coast Mainline are via Retford Station on the Lincoln to Sheffield line. Car parking is free at this station and a self-service ticket machine is located on Platform 1.

== Education ==
Saxilby has its own primary school, Saxilby Church of England Primary School, which received an overall judgement of Good on their 2023 Ofsted inspection. A number of secondary schools are located nearby, such as the Queen Elizabeth's High School in Gainsborough, Lincoln Castle Academy on Riseholme Road, Lincoln Christ's Hospital School on Wragby Road in Lincoln, all of which receive children from the village. There are two private preschool nurseries.

== Religion ==
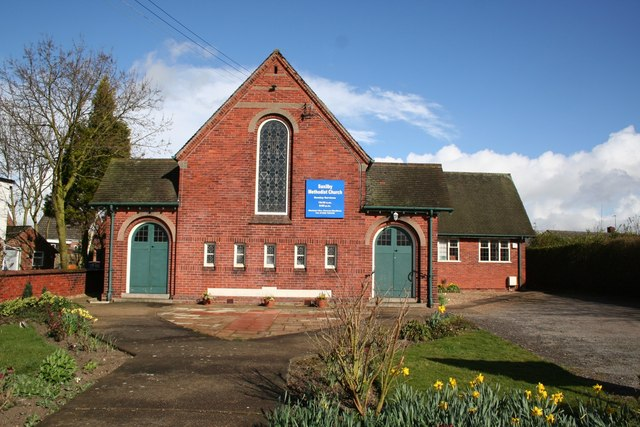
Saxilby Methodist Church, now Plymouth Brethren

Saxilby has been served by various different Christian churches including Church of England, Methodist, Wesleyan and, at one point, a St Andrew's Mission House. St Botolph's Church dates from the 12th-century. The Methodist church closed in 2020, and the building is now occupied by the Plymouth Brethren Christian Church.

== Sport ==
The majority of sport in the village can be found at the Memorial Field. The Memorial Field is home to Saxilby Tennis Club, Saxilby Cricket Club, Saxilby Bowls Club and Saxilby Athletic F.C.

Saxilby Tennis Club was founded in 1925 and has been a part of the community ever since. The club play in multiple leagues including; The Lincoln District League, The Gainsborough League and North Kelsey Winter league.

Saxilby Athletic F.C. is a Men's football club that compete in the Lincoln Sunday Football League. Saxilby Athletic J.F.C. is a junior football club with male and female teams in a variety of age groups.

== Amenities ==
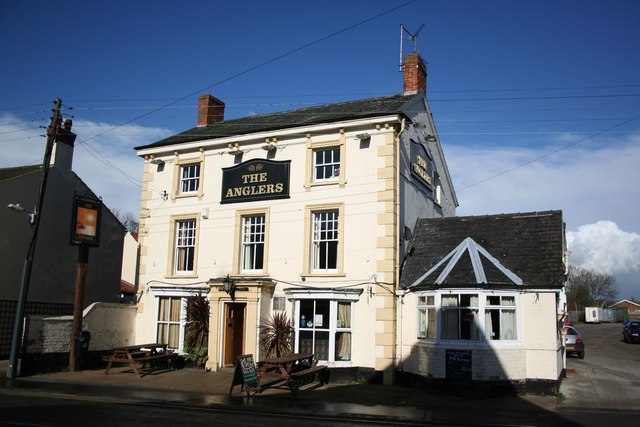
The Anglers on the High Street

Saxilby has a range of shops and retail outlets including a pharmacy and a Post Office, and two pubs.

The St Andrew's Community Centre is located on the recreation field and is home to two function rooms, the Pavilion Bar & Kitchen, the Parish Office, and Saxilby Library. The Village Hall, a former United Free Methodist Church, is used by Saxilby Drama Circle and Saxilby Women's Institute, and is a venue for other events. Saxilby is also home to an active Scout and Guide community, with all main sections of each movement present. The majority of these groups meet in the Jean Reville Memorial Scout and Guide HQ on Bridge Street. St Boltolph's Church also has a small hall available to hire and this is home to various groups and activities.

== Twinning ==
Saxilby is twinned with Haarlemmerliede en Spaarnwoude in the Netherlands.
