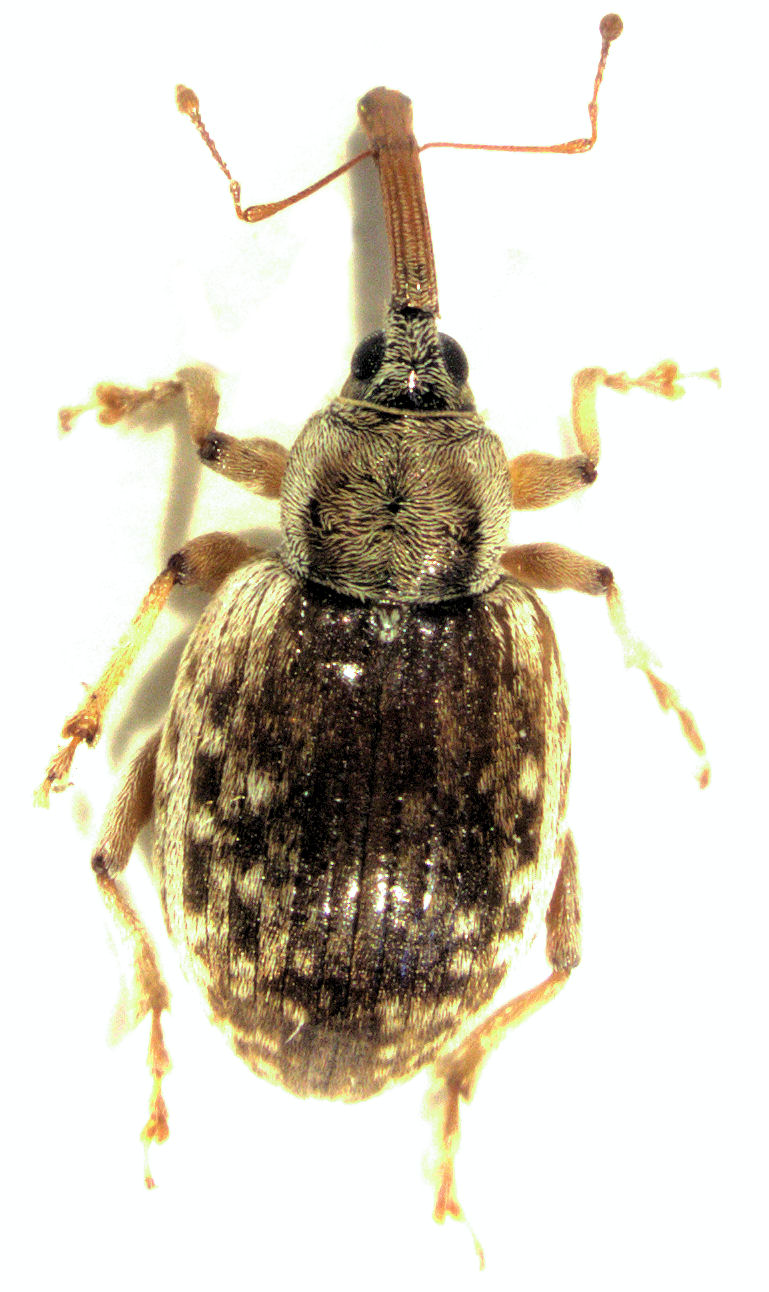
- Philacta testacea

Scientific classification
- Kingdom: Animalia
- Phylum: Arthropoda
- Class: Insecta
- Order: Coleoptera
- Suborder: Polyphaga
- Infraorder: Cucujiformia
- Superfamily: Curculionoidea
- Family: Erirhinidae; Schönherr, 1825

= Erirhinidae =

Family of beetles

Erirhinidae is a family of marsh weevils in the order Coleoptera. There are about 12 genera and at least 40 described species in Erirhinidae.

The family Erirhinidae is sometimes treated as a subfamily of Brachyceridae, Erirhininae.

== Genera ==
These 12 genera belong to the family Erirhinidae.

- Brachybamus Germar, 1835^{i c g b}
- Cyrtobagous Hustache, 1929^{i c g b}
- Grypus Germar, 1817^{i c g b}
- Lissorhoptrus LeConte, 1876^{i c g b} (rice water weevils)
- Neochetina Hustache, 1926^{i c g b} (waterhyacinth weevils)
- Notaris Germar, 1817^{i c g b}
- Notiodes Schönherr, 1838^{i c g b}
- Onychylis LeConte, 1876^{i c g b}
- Procas Stephens, 1831^{i c g b}
- Ruffodytes Osella, 1973^{g}
- Stenopelmus Schönherr, 1835^{i c g b}
- Tanysphyrus Germar, 1817^{i c g b}

Data sources: i = ITIS, c = Catalogue of Life, g = GBIF, b = Bugguide.net
