= List of Oxalidales of South Africa =

Flowering plants in the order Oxalidales recorded from South Africa

Oxalidales is an order of flowering plants, included within the rosid subgroup of eudicots. Compound leaves are common in Oxalidales and the majority of the species in this order have five or six sepals and petals.

The anthophytes are a grouping of plant taxa bearing flower-like reproductive structures. They were formerly thought to be a clade comprising plants bearing flower-like structures. The group contained the angiosperms - the extant flowering plants, such as roses and grasses - as well as the Gnetales and the extinct Bennettitales.

23,420 species of vascular plant have been recorded in South Africa, making it the sixth most species-rich country in the world and the most species-rich country on the African continent. Of these, 153 species are considered to be threatened. Nine biomes have been described in South Africa: Fynbos, Succulent Karoo, desert, Nama Karoo, grassland, savanna, Albany thickets, the Indian Ocean coastal belt, and forests.

The 2018 South African National Biodiversity Institute's National Biodiversity Assessment plant checklist lists 35,130 taxa in the phyla Anthocerotophyta (hornworts (6)), Anthophyta (flowering plants (33534)), Bryophyta (mosses (685)), Cycadophyta (cycads (42)), Lycopodiophyta (Lycophytes(45)), Marchantiophyta (liverworts (376)), Pinophyta (conifers (33)), and Pteridophyta (cryptogams (408)).

Four families are represented in the literature. Listed taxa include species, subspecies, varieties, and forms as recorded, some of which have subsequently been allocated to other taxa as synonyms, in which cases the accepted taxon is appended to the listing. Multiple entries under alternative names reflect taxonomic revision over time.

== Connaraceae ==
Family: Connaraceae,

=== Cnestis ===
Genus Cnestis:

- Cnestis polyphylla Lam. indigenous

== Cunoniaceae ==
Family: Cunoniaceae,

=== Cunonia ===
Genus Cunonia:

- Cunonia capensis L. endemic

=== Platylophus ===
Genus Platylophus:

- Platylophus trifoliatus (L.f.) D.Don, endemic

== Elaeocarpaceae ==
Family: Elaeocarpaceae

=== Elaeocarpus ===
Genus Elaeocarpus

- Elaeocarpus reticulatus Sm. not indigenous, cultivated, naturalised

== Oxalidaceae ==
Family: Oxalidaceae,

=== Oxalis ===
Genus Oxalis:

- Oxalis adenodes Sond. indigenous
- Oxalis adspersa Eckl. & Zeyh. endemic
- Oxalis albiuscula T.M.Salter, endemic
- Oxalis algoensis Eckl. & Zeyh. endemic
- Oxalis ambigua Jacq. endemic
- Oxalis amblyodonta T.M.Salter, endemic
- Oxalis amblyosepala Schltr. endemic
- Oxalis annae F.Bolus, endemic
- Oxalis anomala T.M.Salter, endemic
- Oxalis argillacea F.Bolus, endemic
- Oxalis argyrophylla T.M.Salter, endemic
- Oxalis aridicola T.M.Salter, endemic
- Oxalis attaquana T.M.Salter, indigenous
- Oxalis aurea Schltr. endemic
- Oxalis ausensis R.Knuth, indigenous
- Oxalis beneprotecta Dinter ex R.Knuth, indigenous
- Oxalis bifida Thunb. endemic
- Oxalis bifurca Lodd. indigenous
  - Oxalis bifurca Lodd. var. angustiloba Sond. endemic
  - Oxalis bifurca Lodd. var. bifurca, endemic
- Oxalis blastorrhiza T.M.Salter, endemic
- Oxalis bowiei Lindl. endemic
- Oxalis burkei Sond. endemic
- Oxalis burtoniae T.M.Salter, endemic
- Oxalis callimarginata Weintroub, accepted as Oxalis goniorrhiza Eckl. & Zeyh. present
- Oxalis callosa R.Knuth, endemic
  - Oxalis callosa R.Knuth var. callosa, endemic
  - Oxalis callosa R.Knuth var. minor T.M.Salter, endemic
- Oxalis calvinensis R.Knuth, endemic
- Oxalis camelopardalis T.M.Salter, endemic
- Oxalis campicola T.M.Salter, endemic
- Oxalis campylorhiza T.M.Salter, endemic
- Oxalis capillacea E.Mey. ex Sond. endemic
- Oxalis caprina Thunb. endemic
- Oxalis cathara T.M.Salter, endemic
- Oxalis ciliaris Jacq. indigenous
  - Oxalis ciliaris Jacq. var. ciliaris, endemic
  - Oxalis ciliaris Jacq. var. pageae (L.Bolus) T.M.Salter, endemic
- Oxalis clavifolia Sond. endemic
- Oxalis commutata Sond. indigenous
  - Oxalis commutata Sond. var. commutata, endemic
  - Oxalis commutata Sond. var. concolor T.M.Salter, endemic
  - Oxalis commutata Sond. var. montana T.M.Salter, endemic
- Oxalis comosa E.Mey. ex Sond. endemic
- Oxalis compressa L.f. indigenous
  - Oxalis compressa L.f. var. compressa, endemic
  - Oxalis compressa L.f. var. purpurascens T.M.Salter, endemic
- Oxalis comptonii T.M.Salter, endemic
- Oxalis confertifolia (Kuntze) R.Knuth, accepted as Oxalis confertifolia (Kuntze) R.Knuth var. confertifolia, endemic
- Oxalis convexula Jacq. endemic
- Oxalis copiosa F.Bolus, indigenous
- Oxalis corniculata L. not indigenous, naturalised, invasive
- Oxalis creaseyi T.M.Salter, endemic
- Oxalis crispula Sond. endemic
- Oxalis crocea T.M.Salter, indigenous
- Oxalis cuneata Jacq. endemic
- Oxalis davyana R.Knuth, endemic
- Oxalis densa N.E.Br. endemic
- Oxalis dentata Jacq. accepted as Oxalis livida Jacq. var. altior T.M.Salter, present
- Oxalis depressa Eckl. & Zeyh. indigenous
- Oxalis deserticola T.M.Salter, endemic
- Oxalis dichotoma T.M.Salter, endemic
- Oxalis dilatata L.Bolus, endemic
- Oxalis dines Ornduff, endemic
- Oxalis disticha Jacq. endemic
- Oxalis dregei Sond. endemic
- Oxalis droseroides E.Mey. ex Sond. endemic
- Oxalis duriuscula Schltr. endemic
- Oxalis ebracteata Savign. endemic
- Oxalis eckloniana C.Presl, indigenous
  - Oxalis eckloniana C.Presl var. eckloniana, endemic
  - Oxalis eckloniana C.Presl var. hopefieldiana R.Knuth, endemic
  - Oxalis eckloniana C.Presl var. montigena (Schltr.) R.Knuth, endemic
  - Oxalis eckloniana C.Presl var. robusta T.M.Salter, endemic
  - Oxalis eckloniana C.Presl var. sonderi T.M.Salter, endemic
- Oxalis engleriana Schltr. endemic
- Oxalis ericifolia Oberl. & Dreyer, endemic
- Oxalis exserta T.M.Salter, indigenous
- Oxalis extensa T.M.Salter, indigenous
- Oxalis fabifolia Jacq. accepted as Oxalis flava L. var. fabifolia (Jacq.) Dreyer & Oberl. endemic
- Oxalis falcatula T.M.Salter, endemic
- Oxalis fergusonae T.M.Salter, endemic
- Oxalis fibrosa F.Bolus, endemic
- Oxalis flava L. endemic
  - Oxalis flava L. var. fabifolia (Jacq.) Dreyer & Oberl. endemic
  - Oxalis flava L. var. flava, endemic
  - Oxalis flava L. var. unifoliolata Dreyer & Oberl. endemic
- Oxalis flaviuscula T.M.Salter, endemic
  - Oxalis flaviuscula T.M.Salter var. flaviuscula, endemic
  - Oxalis flaviuscula T.M.Salter var. longifolia T.M.Salter, endemic
- Oxalis fourcadei T.M.Salter, endemic
- Oxalis foveolata Turcz. endemic
- Oxalis fragilis T.M.Salter, endemic
  - Oxalis fragilis T.M.Salter var. fragilis, endemic
  - Oxalis fragilis T.M.Salter var. pellucida T.M.Salter, endemic
- Oxalis furcillata T.M.Salter, indigenous
  - Oxalis furcillata T.M.Salter var. caulescens T.M.Salter, endemic
  - Oxalis furcillata T.M.Salter var. furcillata, endemic
- Oxalis giftbergensis T.M.Salter, endemic
- Oxalis glabra Thunb. endemic
- Oxalis goniorrhiza Eckl. & Zeyh. endemic
- Oxalis gracilipes Schltr. endemic
- Oxalis gracilis Jacq. indigenous
  - Oxalis gracilis Jacq. var. gracilis, endemic
  - Oxalis gracilis Jacq. var. lilacea T.M.Salter, endemic
  - Oxalis gracilis Jacq. var. purpurea T.M.Salter, endemic
- Oxalis grammopetala Sond. endemic
- Oxalis grammophylla T.M.Salter, endemic
- Oxalis haedulipes T.M.Salter, indigenous
- Oxalis heidelbergensis T.M.Salter, endemic
- Oxalis helicoides T.M.Salter, indigenous
  - Oxalis helicoides T.M.Salter var. alba T.M.Salter, endemic
  - Oxalis helicoides T.M.Salter var. helicoides, endemic
- Oxalis heterophylla DC. endemic
- Oxalis hirsuta Sond. endemic
- Oxalis hirta L. indigenous
  - Oxalis hirta L. var. canescens R.Knuth, endemic
  - Oxalis hirta L. var. hirta, endemic
  - Oxalis hirta L. var. intermedia T.M.Salter, endemic
  - Oxalis hirta L. var. polioeides T.M.Salter, endemic
  - Oxalis hirta L. var. secunda (Jacq.) T.M.Salter, endemic
  - Oxalis hirta L. var. tenuicaulis R.Knuth, endemic
  - Oxalis hirta L. var. tubiflora (Jacq.) T.M.Salter, endemic
- Oxalis hygrophila Dreyer, endemic
- Oxalis imbricata Eckl. & Zeyh. indigenous
  - Oxalis imbricata Eckl. & Zeyh. var. cuneifolia T.M.Salter, endemic
  - Oxalis imbricata Eckl. & Zeyh. var. imbricata, endemic
  - Oxalis imbricata Eckl. & Zeyh. var. violacea R.Knuth, endemic
- Oxalis inaequalis Weintroub, endemic
- Oxalis incarnata L. endemic
- Oxalis inconspicua T.M.Salter, endemic
- Oxalis involuta T.M.Salter, endemic
- Oxalis ioeides T.M.Salter & Exell, endemic
- Oxalis kamiesbergensis T.M.Salter, endemic
- Oxalis knuthiana T.M.Salter, indigenous
- Oxalis lanata L.f., indigenous
  - Oxalis lanata L.f. var. lanata, endemic
  - Oxalis lanata L.f. var. rosea T.M.Salter, endemic
- Oxalis lasiorrhiza T.M.Salter, endemic
- Oxalis lateriflora Jacq. accepted as Oxalis livida Jacq. var. altior T.M.Salter, present
- Oxalis latifolia Kunth, not indigenous; nat; inv
- Oxalis lawsonii F.Bolus, indigenous
- Oxalis laxicaulis R.Knuth, indigenous
- Oxalis leipoldtii Schltr. endemic
- Oxalis leptocalyx Sond. endemic
- Oxalis leptogramma T.M.Salter, endemic
- Oxalis levis T.M.Salter, endemic
- Oxalis lichenoides T.M.Salter, endemic
- Oxalis lindaviana Schltr. endemic
- Oxalis linearis Jacq. endemic
- Oxalis lineolata T.M.Salter, endemic
- Oxalis livida Jacq. indigenous
  - Oxalis livida Jacq. var. altior T.M.Salter, endemic
  - Oxalis livida Jacq. var. livida, endemic
- Oxalis louisae T.M.Salter, endemic
- Oxalis luteola Jacq. endemic
- Oxalis macra Schltr. endemic
- Oxalis marlothii Schltr. ex R.Knuth, endemic
- Oxalis massoniana T.M.Salter, indigenous
  - Oxalis massoniana T.M.Salter var. flavescens T.M.Salter, endemic
  - Oxalis massoniana T.M.Salter var. massoniana, endemic
- Oxalis meisneri Sond. endemic
- Oxalis melanograpta T.M.Salter, endemic
- Oxalis melanosticta Sond. indigenous
- Oxalis melanosticta Sond. var. latifolia T.M.Salter, endemic
- Oxalis melanosticta Sond. var. melanosticta, endemic
- Oxalis microdonta T.M.Salter, endemic
- Oxalis minuta Thunb. endemic
- Oxalis monophylla L. indigenous
  - Oxalis monophylla L. var. minor T.M.Salter, endemic
  - Oxalis monophylla L. var. monophylla, endemic
  - Oxalis monophylla L. var. rotundifolia T.M.Salter, endemic
  - Oxalis monophylla L. var. stenophylla (Meisn.) Sond. endemic
- Oxalis multicaulis Eckl. & Zeyh. endemic
  - Oxalis multicaulis Eckl. & Zeyh. var. multicaulis, endemic
  - Oxalis multicaulis Eckl. & Zeyh. var. stolonifera T.M.Salter, endemic
- Oxalis namaquana Sond. indigenous
- Oxalis natans Thunb. [1], endemic
- Oxalis nidulans Eckl. & Zeyh. [1], indigenous
  - Oxalis nidulans Eckl. & Zeyh. var. denticulata (Wolley-Dod) T.M.Salter, endemic
  - Oxalis nidulans Eckl. & Zeyh. var. nidulans, endemic
- Oxalis nivea Roets, Dreyer & Oberl. endemic
- Oxalis nortieri T.M.Salter, endemic
- Oxalis obliquifolia Steud. ex A.Rich. indigenous
- Oxalis obtusa Jacq. indigenous
- Oxalis oculifera E.G.H.Oliv. endemic
- Oxalis odorata J.C.Manning & Goldblatt, endemic
- Oxalis oligophylla T.M.Salter, endemic
- Oxalis orbicularis T.M.Salter, endemic
- Oxalis oreithala T.M.Salter, endemic
- Oxalis oreophila T.M.Salter, endemic
- Oxalis orthopoda T.M.Salter, endemic
- Oxalis pallens Eckl. & Zeyh. endemic
- Oxalis palmifrons T.M.Salter, endemic
- Oxalis pardalis Sond. endemic
- Oxalis pendulifolia T.M.Salter, endemic
- Oxalis perineson T.M.Salter & Exell, endemic
- Oxalis pes-caprae L. indigenous
  - Oxalis pes-caprae L. var. pes-caprae, indigenous
  - Oxalis pes-caprae L. var. sericea (L.f.) T.M.Salter, indigenous
- Oxalis petiolulata F.Bolus, endemic
- Oxalis petraea T.M.Salter, endemic
- Oxalis petricola Dreyer, Roets & Oberl. endemic
- Oxalis phloxidiflora Schltr. endemic
- Oxalis pillansiana T.M.Salter & Exell, endemic
- Oxalis pocockiae L.Bolus, endemic
- Oxalis polyphylla Jacq. indigenous
  - Oxalis polyphylla Jacq. var. alba T.M.Salter, endemic
  - Oxalis polyphylla Jacq. var. heptaphylla T.M.Salter, endemic
  - Oxalis polyphylla Jacq. var. minor T.M.Salter, endemic
  - Oxalis polyphylla Jacq. var. pentaphylla (Sims) T.M.Salter, endemic
  - Oxalis polyphylla Jacq. var. polyphylla, endemic
  - Oxalis polyphylla Jacq. var. pubescens Sond. endemic
- Oxalis porphyriosiphon T.M.Salter, endemic
- Oxalis primuloides R.Knuth, endemic
- Oxalis psammophila G.Will. endemic
- Oxalis pseudohirta T.M.Salter, endemic
- Oxalis psilopoda Turcz. endemic
- Oxalis pulchella Jacq. indigenous
  - Oxalis pulchella Jacq. var. glauca T.M.Salter, endemic
  - Oxalis pulchella Jacq. var. leucotricha (Turcz.) T.M.Salter, endemic
  - Oxalis pulchella Jacq. var. pulchella, indigenous
  - Oxalis pulchella Jacq. var. tomentosa Sond. indigenous
- Oxalis pulvinata Sond. endemic
- Oxalis punctata Thunb. endemic
- Oxalis purpurata Jacq. endemic
- Oxalis purpurea L. [1], indigenous
- Oxalis pusilla Jacq. [1], endemic
- Oxalis reclinata Jacq. indigenous
  - Oxalis reclinata Jacq. var. micromera (Sond.) T.M.Salter, endemic
  - Oxalis reclinata Jacq. var. quinata T.M.Salter, endemic
  - Oxalis reclinata Jacq. var. reclinata, endemic
- Oxalis recticaulis Sond. endemic
- Oxalis reflexa T.M.Salter, endemic
- Oxalis rhomboidea T.M.Salter, endemic
- Oxalis robinsonii T.M.Salter & Exell, endemic
- Oxalis rosettifolia Dreyer, Roets & Oberl. endemic
- Oxalis rubricallosa Dreyer, Roets & Oberl. endemic
- Oxalis rubro-punctata T.M.Salter, endemic
- Oxalis salteri L.Bolus, endemic
- Oxalis saltusbelli Dreyer & Roets, indigenous
- Oxalis semiloba Sond. indigenous
  - Oxalis semiloba Sond. subsp. semiloba, indigenous
- Oxalis senecta T.M.Salter, endemic
- Oxalis setosa E.Mey. ex Sond. indigenous
- Oxalis simplex T.M.Salter, endemic
- Oxalis smithiana Eckl. & Zeyh. indigenous
- Oxalis sonderiana (Kuntze) T.M.Salter, endemic
- Oxalis sororia Schltr. ex R.Knuth, accepted as Oxalis recticaulis Sond.
- Oxalis stellata Eckl. & Zeyh. indigenous
  - Oxalis stellata Eckl. & Zeyh. var. glandulosa T.M.Salter, endemic
  - Oxalis stellata Eckl. & Zeyh. var. gracilior T.M.Salter, endemic
  - Oxalis stellata Eckl. & Zeyh. var. montaguensis T.M.Salter, endemic
  - Oxalis stellata Eckl. & Zeyh. var. stellata, endemic
- Oxalis stenopetala T.M.Salter, endemic
- Oxalis stenoptera Turcz. indigenous
  - Oxalis stenoptera Turcz. var. alba T.M.Salter, endemic
  - Oxalis stenoptera Turcz. var. stenoptera, endemic
  - Oxalis stenoptera Turcz. var. undulata, endemic
- Oxalis stenorrhyncha T.M.Salter, endemic
- Oxalis stictocheila T.M.Salter, endemic
- Oxalis stokoei Weintroub, endemic
- Oxalis strigosa T.M.Salter, endemic
- Oxalis suavis R.Knuth, endemic
- Oxalis subsessilis L.Bolus, endemic
- Oxalis suteroides T.M.Salter, indigenous
- Oxalis tenella Jacq. [2], endemic
- Oxalis tenuifolia Jacq. endemic
- Oxalis tenuipes T.M.Salter, indigenous
  - Oxalis tenuipes T.M.Salter var. biapiculata T.M.Salter, endemic
  - Oxalis tenuipes T.M.Salter var. tenuipes, endemic
- Oxalis tenuis T.M.Salter, endemic
- Oxalis tomentosa Thunb. [1], endemic
- Oxalis tragopoda T.M.Salter, indigenous
- Oxalis truncatula Jacq. endemic
- Oxalis tysonii E.Phillips, endemic
- Oxalis uliginosa Schltr. endemic
- Oxalis urbaniana Schltr. accepted as Oxalis goniorrhiza Eckl. & Zeyh. present
- Oxalis variifolia Steud. endemic
- Oxalis versicolor L. indigenous
  - Oxalis versicolor L. var. flaviflora Sond. endemic
  - Oxalis versicolor L. var. latifolia Wolley-Dod, endemic
  - Oxalis versicolor L. var. versicolor, endemic
- Oxalis virginea Jacq. endemic
- Oxalis viscidula Schltr. endemic
- Oxalis viscosa E.Mey. ex Sond. endemic
- Oxalis xantha T.M.Salter, endemic
- Oxalis zeekoevleyensis R.Knuth, endemic
- Oxalis zeyheri Sond. endemic
