= Thysanus =

Thysanus may refer to:

- Thysanus, a genus of wasps in the family Signiphoridae described in 1840
- Thysanus, a genus of flowering plants in the family Connaraceae; synonym of Cnestis
- Thysanus, a genus of cnidarians in the family Faviidae; unknown status, described in 1863 by Duncan, a junior homonym
