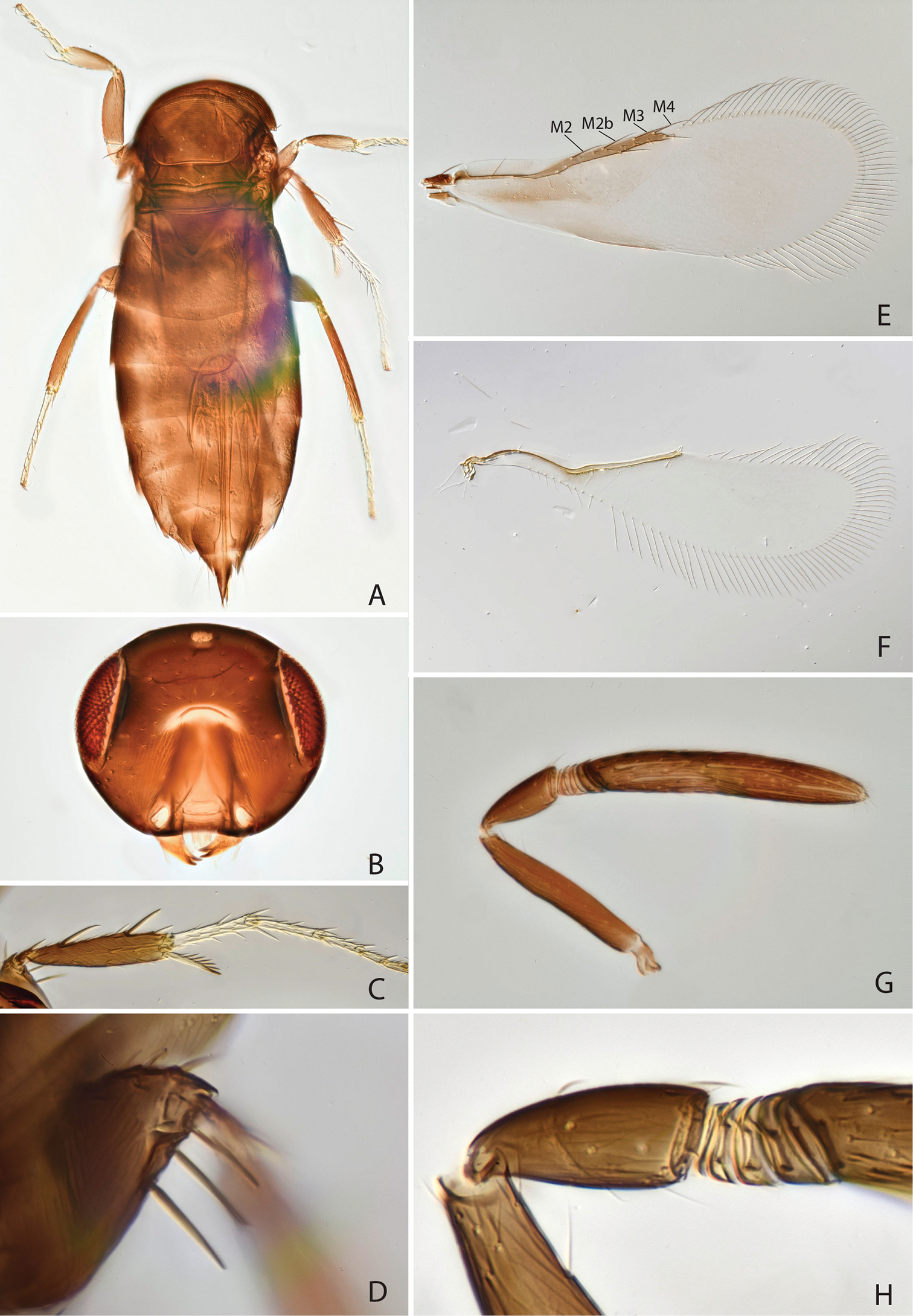
- Chartocerus sumatrensis

Scientific classification
- Kingdom: Animalia
- Phylum: Arthropoda
- Class: Insecta
- Order: Hymenoptera
- Family: Signiphoridae
- Genus: Chartocerus; Motschulsky, 1859

Type species
- Chartocerus musciformis Motschulsky, 1859

= Chartocerus =

Genus of parasitic wasps

Chartocerus is a genus of parasitic wasps under the family Signiphoridae. Their hosts include aphids, psyllids, mealybugs, scale insects, and flies.

== Species ==
This genus contains 27 species:

- Chartocerus australicus Girault, 1913
- Chartocerus australiensis Ashmead, 1900
- Chartocerus axillaris De Santis, 1973
- Chartocerus beethoveni Girault, 1915
- Chartocerus bengalensis Hayat, 2004
- Chartocerus conjugalis Mercet, 1916
- Chartocerus corvinus Girault, 1913
- Chartocerus dactylopii Ashmead, 1900
- Chartocerus elongatus Girault, 1916
- Chartocerus fimbriae Hayat, 1970
- Chartocerus funeralis Girault, 1913
- Chartocerus hebes Girault, 1929
- Chartocerus hyalipennis Hayat, 1970
- Chartocerus intermedius Hayat, 1976
- Chartocerus kerrichi Agarwal, 1963
- Chartocerus kurdjumovi Nikol'skaya, 1950
- Chartocerus musciformis Motschulsky, 1859
- Chartocerus niger Ashmead, 1900
- Chartocerus novitzkyi Domenichini, 1955
- Chartocerus philippiae Risbec, 1957
- Chartocerus ranae Subba Rao, 1957
- Chartocerus rosanovi Sugonjaev, 1968
- Chartocerus ruskini Girault, 1921
- Chartocerus simillimus Mercet, 1917
- Chartocerus subaeneus Forster, 1878
- Chartocerus sumatrensis
- Chartocerus thusanoides Girault, 1915
- Chartocerus ubaidillahi
- Chartocerus walkeri Hayat, 1970
