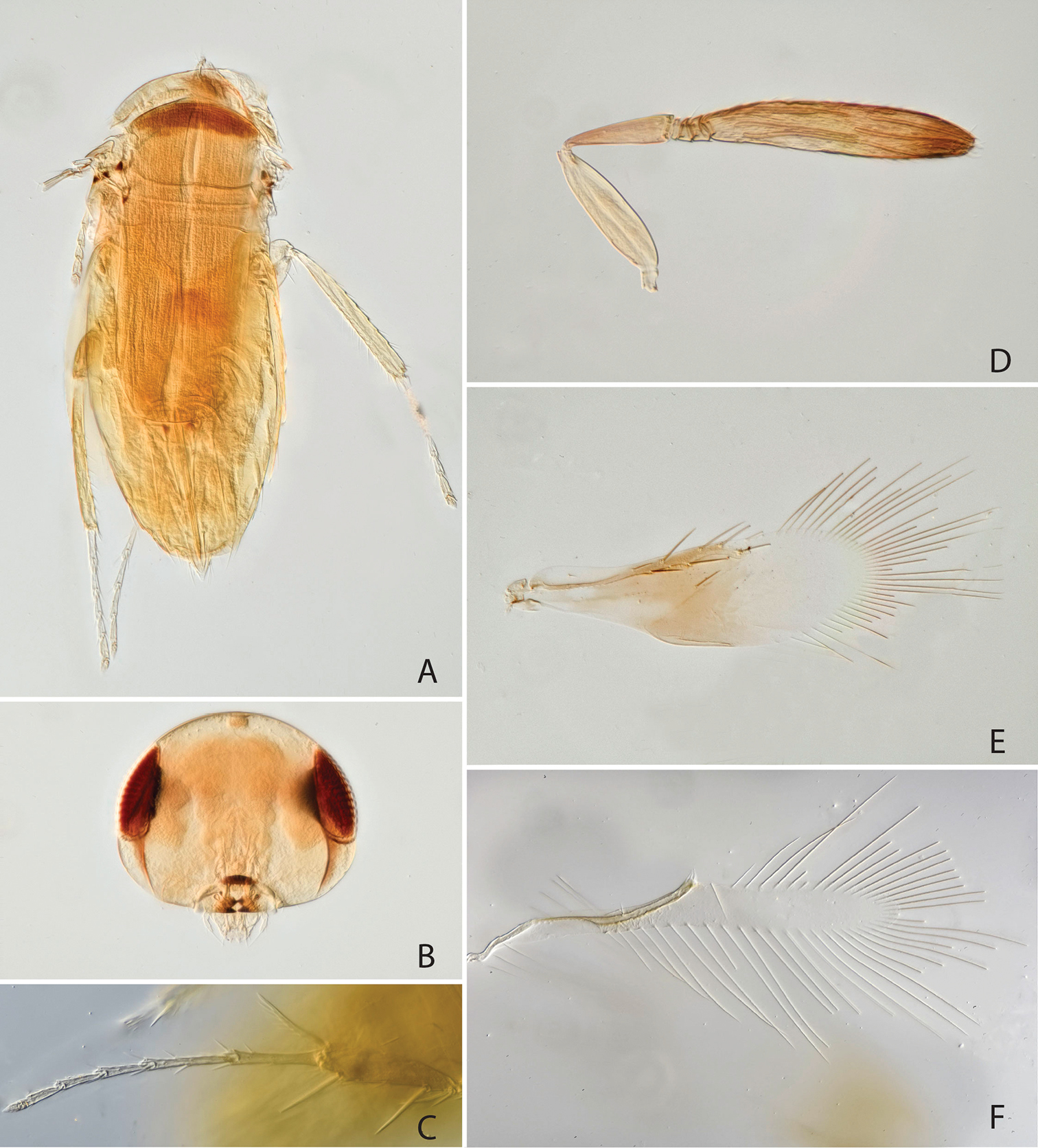
- Signiphora perpauca Girault, female A body in dorsal view B head in frontal view C middle leg D antenna E fore wing F hind wing

Scientific classification
- Kingdom: Animalia
- Phylum: Arthropoda
- Clade: Pancrustacea
- Class: Insecta
- Order: Hymenoptera
- Superfamily: Chalcidoidea
- Family: Signiphoridae; Howard, 1894

Genera
- Chartocerus; Clytina; Signiphora; Thysanus

= Signiphoridae =

Family of wasps

Signiphoridae (historically also known as Thysanidae) is a small family of parasitic wasps in the superfamily Chalcidoidea. The roughly 80 species are placed in four genera.

== Diagnosis ==
The Signiphoridae range in size from 0.2 to 1.5 mm (7.9 to 59.1 thou). They are usually black, brown, or yellowish, occasionally with salmon pink or white details, but never metallic. Cuticle sculpturing is very light when compared to families such as the Eurytomidae or Chalcididae.

The main diagnostic characteristics are:

- The metasoma is sessile (no "wasp waist"); the propodeum has a medium triangular zone.
- The antennal club is long, unsegmented, and preceded by one to four ring-like segments ("annelli").
- The wings have medium to long marginal setae, short postmarginal and stigmal veins, and no, one or two setae on the membrane.

== Habitat ==
Chartocerus and Thysanus have cosmopolitan distributions. The only formal record for Clytina is from Eastern Europe. Signiphora, which represents more than half of the known species, is primarily Neotropical.

== Biology ==
Most species have been reared in association with scale insects, mealybugs, aphids, psyllids and flies (chamaemyiids, gall-making chloropids, and drosophilid predators of scale insects. They can be either parasitoids or hyperparasitoids. While parasitoids contribute to control populations of other insects, hyperparasitoids can disrupt systems under biological control.

== Systematics and classification ==
Woolley (1988) made several changes in the classification at genus and species level after a phylogenetic analysis of the family. The available generic names in this group are Signiphora Ashmead, Thysanus Walker, Chartocerus Motschulsky, Clytina Erdös, Neosigniphora Rust, Kerrichiella Rozanov, Rozanoviella Subba Rao, Xana Kurdjumov, Matritia Mercet, Signiphorina Nikol'skaya and Neocales Risbec. The four last names are under synonymy or considered as subgenera in Chartocerus. Rozanoviella and Kerrichiella are synonymized under Signiphora. Neosigniphora is synonymized under Thysanus. Hence, currently only four genera are valid. Subfamilies are not recognized.

Signiphoridae are believed to be most closely related to azotine aphelinids.
