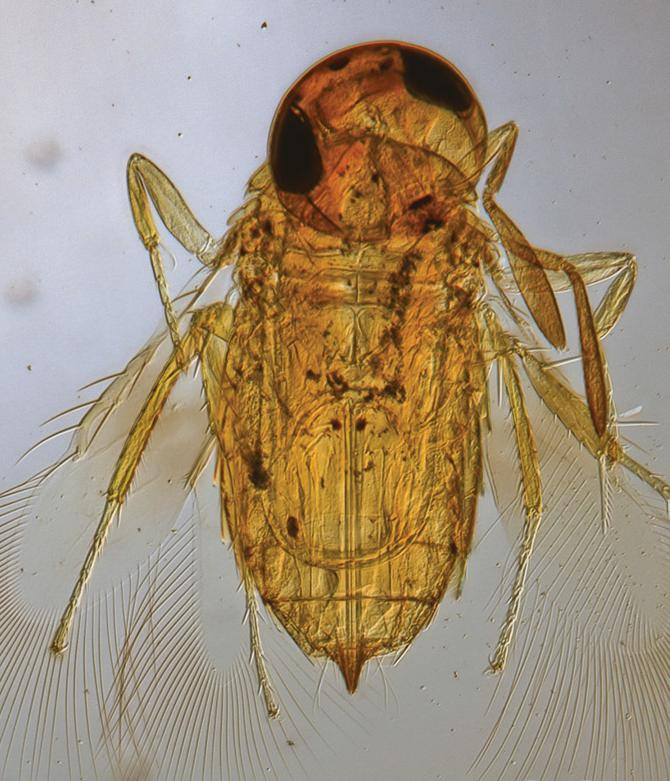
- Signiphora flavella

Scientific classification
- Kingdom: Animalia
- Phylum: Arthropoda
- Class: Insecta
- Order: Hymenoptera
- Family: Signiphoridae
- Genus: Signiphora; Ashmead, 1900

Synonyms
- Kerrichiella Rozanov, 1965; Rozanoviella Subba Rao, 1974; Signiphorella Mercet, 1916

= Signiphora =

Genus of parasitic wasps

Signiphora is a genus of parasitic wasps under the family Signiphoridae. Their hosts include aphids, psyllids, mealybugs, scale insects, and flies. It is primarily found in coastal regions, including the western and eastern coasts of the United States, and the coasts of Chile, Australia, New Zealand, Madagascar, and South Africa.

== Species ==
This genus contains the following species:

- Signiphora aleyrodis Ashmead, 1900
- Signiphora aspidioti Ashmead, 1900
- Signiphora bennetti Woolley & Dal Molin, 2017
- Signiphora bifasciata Ashmead, 1900
- Signiphora biloba Woolley & Dal Molin, 2017
- Signiphora borinquensis Quezada, DeBach, & Rosen, 1973
- Signiphora caridei Brèthes, 1914
- Signiphora citrifolii Ashmead, 1880
- Signiphora coquilletti Ashmead, 1900
- Signiphora curepensis Woolley & Dal Molin, 2017
- Signiphora desantisi De Santis, 1938
- Signiphora dipterophaga Girault, 1916
- Signiphora dozieri Woolley & Dal Molin, 2017
- Signiphora ehleri Woolley & Dal Molin, 2017
- Signiphora euclidi Girault, 1935
- Signiphora falcata Woolley & Dal Molin, 2017
- Signiphora fasciata Girault, 1913
- Signiphora fax Girault, 1913
- Signiphora flava Girault, 1913
- Signiphora flavella Girault, 1913
- Signiphora flavopalliata Ashmead, 1880
- Signiphora frequentior Kerrich, 1953
- Signiphora giraulti Crawford, 1913
- Signiphora hyalinipennis Girault, 1913
- Signiphora insularis Dozier, 1933
- Signiphora jojobae Woolley & Dal Molin, 2017
- Signiphora longitibia Woolley & Dal Molin, 2017
- Signiphora louisianae Dozier, 1933
- Signiphora lutea Rust, 1913
- Signiphora maculata Girault, 1913
- Signiphora maxima Girault, 1913
- Signiphora merceti Malenotti, 1917
- Signiphora mexicana Ashmead, 1900
- Signiphora noacki Ashmead, 1900
- Signiphora perpauca Girault, 1915
- Signiphora plaumanni Woolley & Dal Molin, 2017
- Signiphora polistomyiellia Richards, 1935
- Signiphora pulchra Girault, 1913
- Signiphora rectrix Girault, 1915
- Signiphora renuncula Woolley & Dal Molin, 2017
- Signiphora reticulata Girault, 1913
- Signiphora rhizococci Ashmead, 1900
- Signiphora thoreauini Girault, 1916
- Signiphora townsendi Ashmead, 1900
- Signiphora tridentata Woolley & Dal Molin, 2017
- Signiphora tumida De Santis, 1973
- Signiphora unifasciata Ashmead, 1900
- Signiphora woolleyi Hayat, 2003
- Signiphora xanthographa Blanchard, 1936
- Signiphora zosterica Kerrich, 1953
