= Clytina =

Scientific classification
- Kingdom: Animalia
- Phylum: Arthropoda
- Class: Insecta
- Order: Hymenoptera
- Family: Signiphoridae
- Genus: Clytina; Erdös, 1957
- Species: C. giraudi

Binomial name
- Clytina giraudi Erdös, 1957

Genus of parasitic wasps

Clytina is a genus of parasitic wasps under the family Signiphoridae, found primarily in Mexico and the northern part South America. It contains the single species Clytina giraudi (Erdös, 1957).
