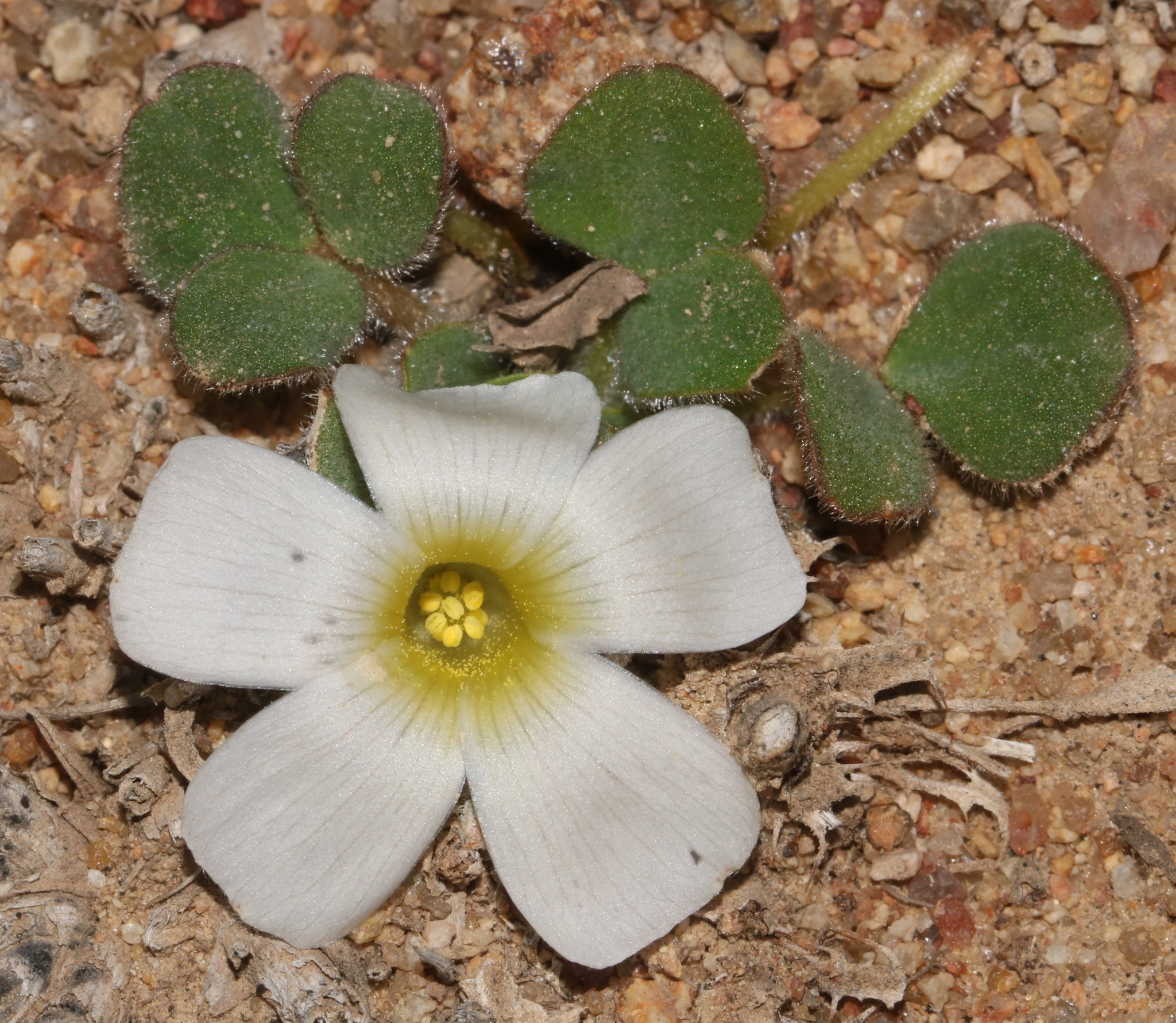

Scientific classification
- Kingdom: Plantae
- Clade: Tracheophytes
- Clade: Angiosperms
- Clade: Eudicots
- Clade: Rosids
- Order: Oxalidales
- Family: Oxalidaceae
- Genus: Oxalis
- Species: O. pulchella

Binomial name
- Oxalis pulchella Jacq.

= Oxalis pulchella =

Species of plant

Oxalis pulchella is a species from the genus Oxalis. The species was first described by Richard Anthony Salisbury.
