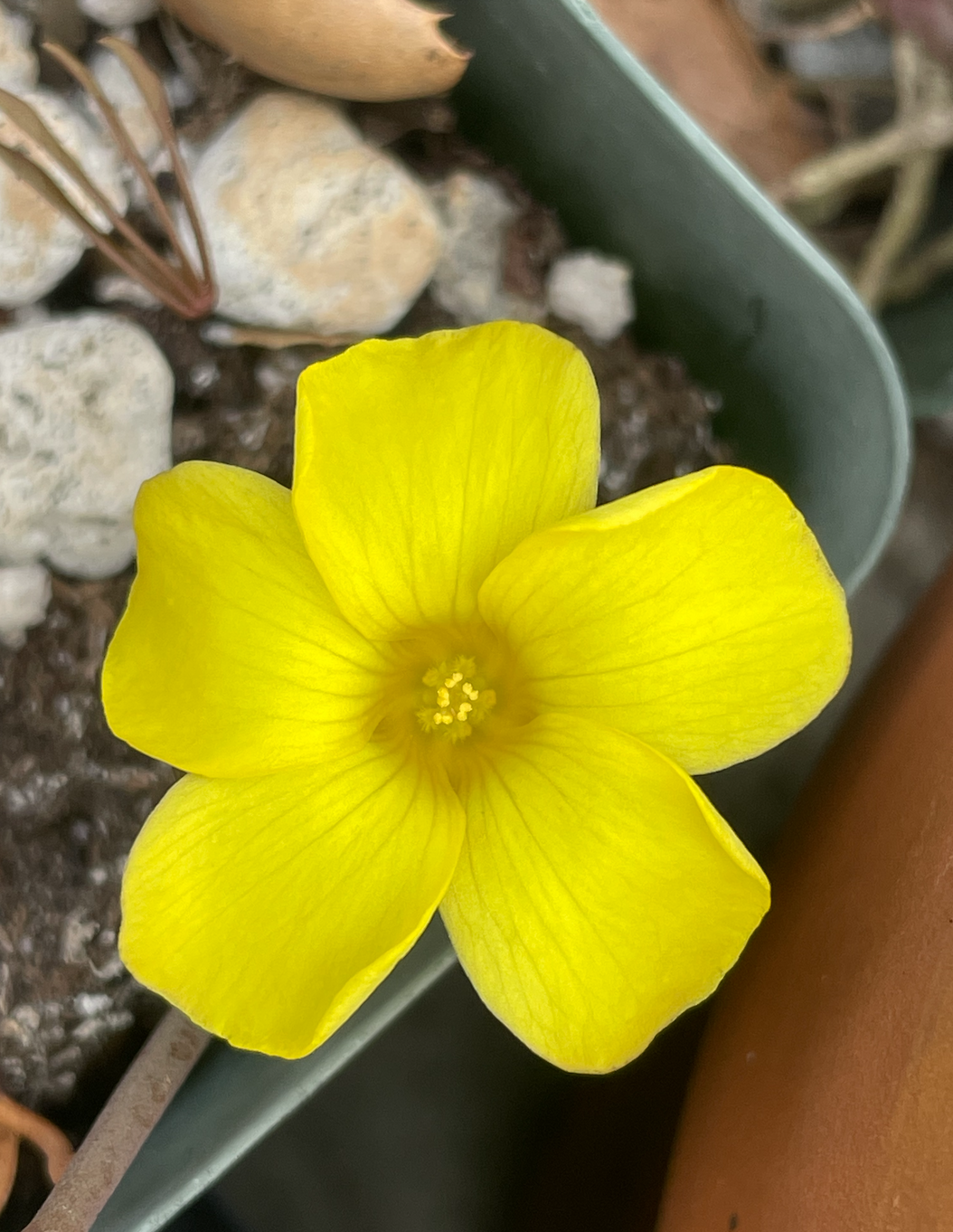

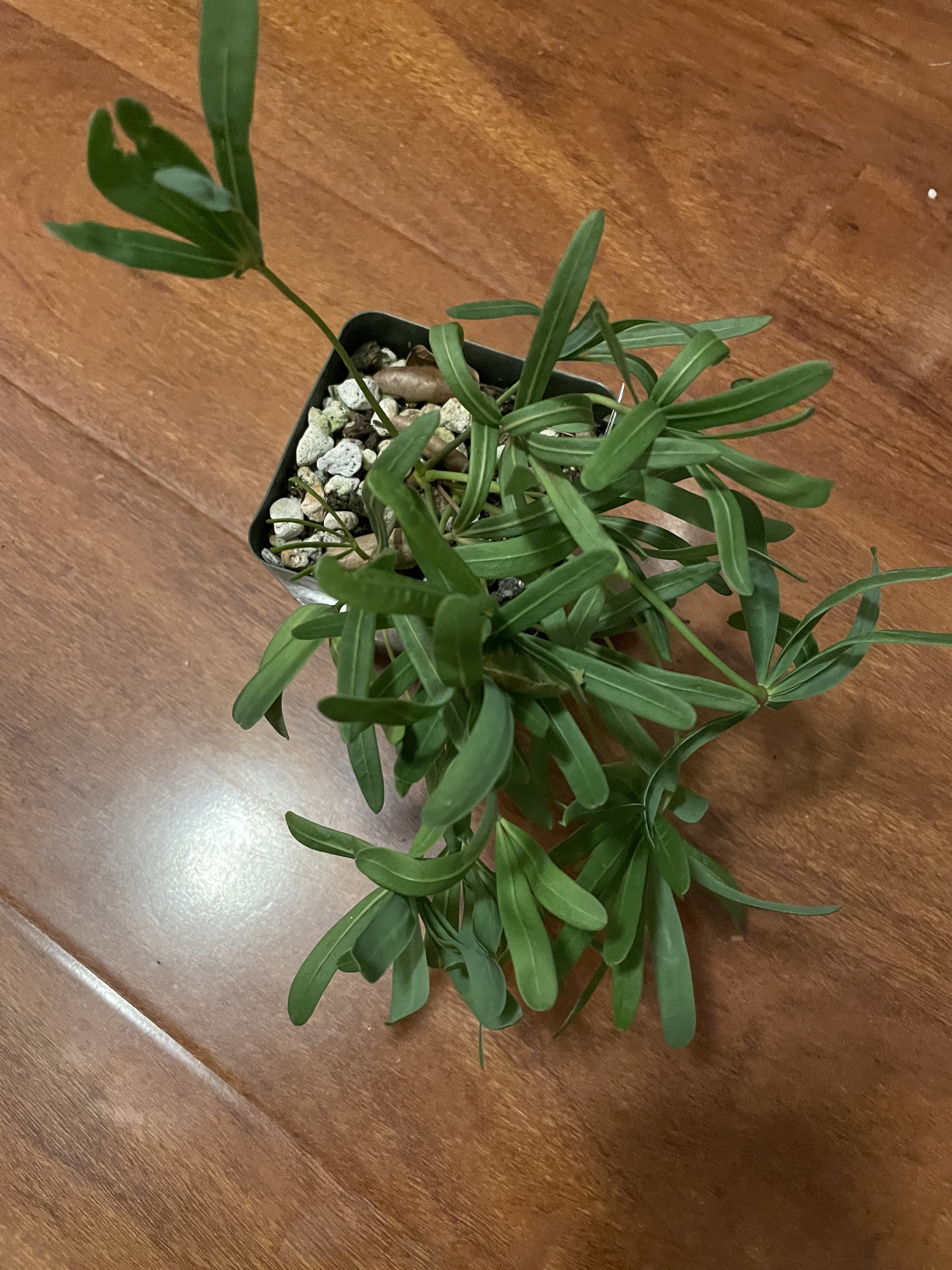

Scientific classification
- Kingdom: Plantae
- Clade: Tracheophytes
- Clade: Angiosperms
- Clade: Eudicots
- Clade: Rosids
- Order: Oxalidales
- Family: Oxalidaceae
- Genus: Oxalis
- Species: O. flava

Binomial name
- Oxalis flava L.

= Oxalis flava =

Species of plant

Oxalis flava is a species of succulent that is native to Cape Province in South Africa. This plant was first described in 1753.

== Description ==
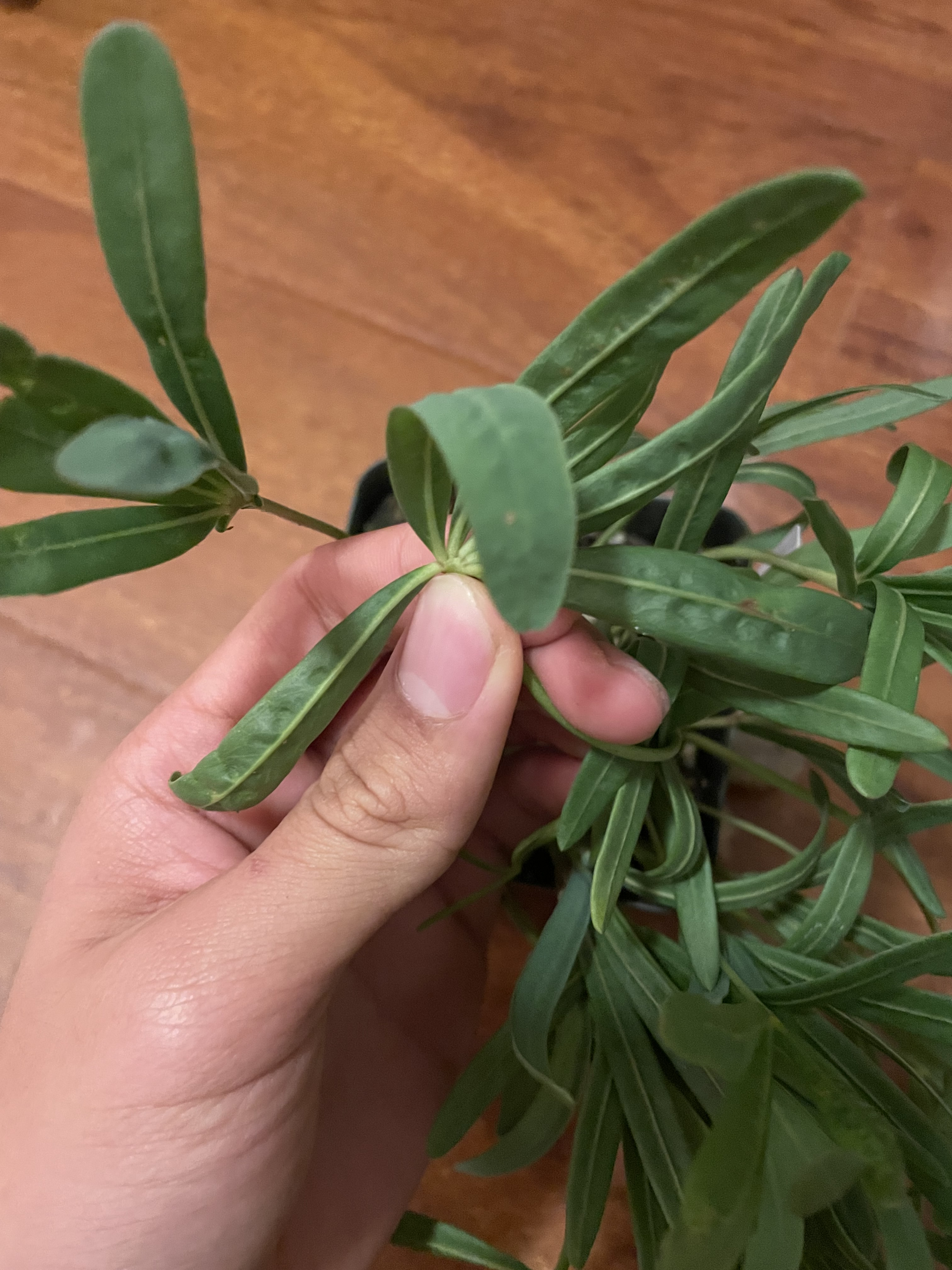
Oxalis flava leaves

This plant is rizhomous, stemless and grows in clumps like most species of the genus Oxalis. There are multiple leaflets on a single leaf. The flowers of this plant can vary depending on the variety, but are similar to typical Oxalis flowers, with five identical petals.
