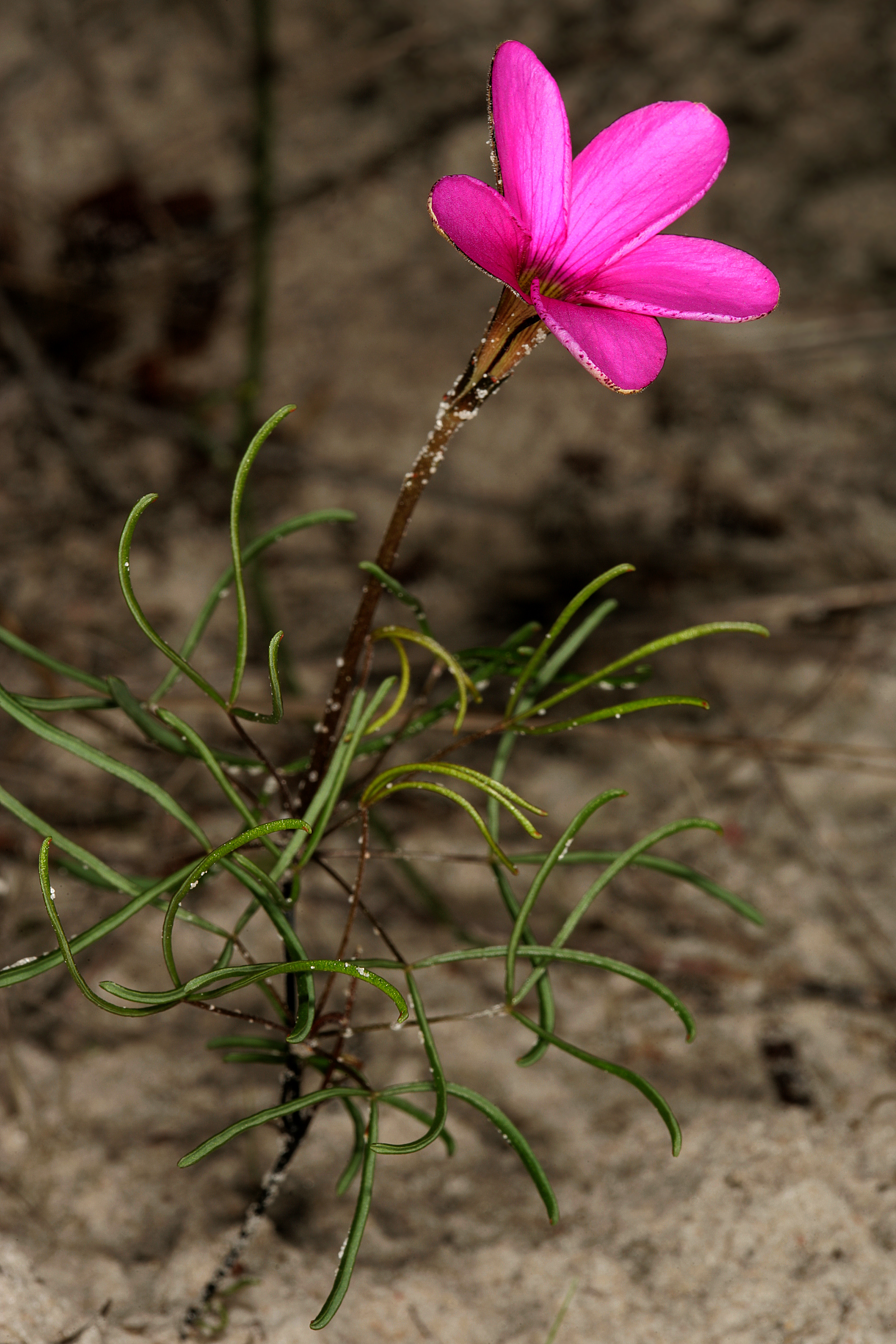
- Habit
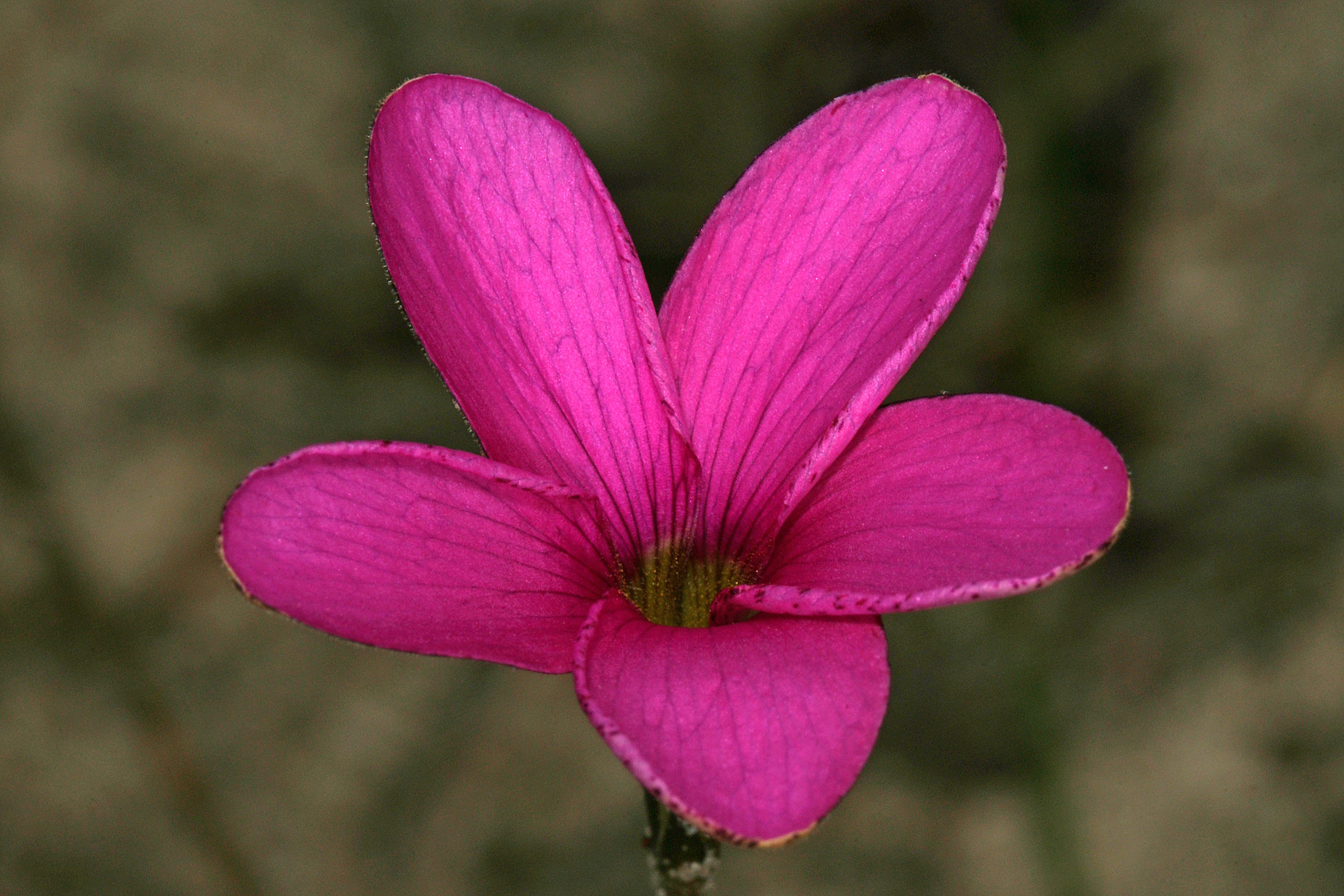
- Close-up of flower

Scientific classification
- Kingdom: Plantae
- Clade: Tracheophytes
- Clade: Angiosperms
- Clade: Eudicots
- Clade: Rosids
- Order: Oxalidales
- Family: Oxalidaceae
- Genus: Oxalis
- Species: O. polyphylla

Binomial name
- Oxalis polyphylla Jacq.

Synonyms
- List: Acetosella pentaphylla (Sims) Kuntze; Acetosella polyphylla (Jacq.) Kuntze; Oxalis amoena Jacq.; Oxalis digitata Poir.; Oxalis falcata Eckl. & Zeyh.; Oxalis filifolia Jacq.; Oxalis gracilis Eckl. & Zeyh.; Oxalis pentaphylla Sims; Oxalis revoluta E.Mey.; Oxalis versicolor Jacq.

= Oxalis polyphylla =

Species of plant

Oxalis polyphylla, the finger sorrel, is a species of flowering plant in the family Oxalidaceae. The flower color is variable from lilac to deep pink or magenta. It is native to the southern Cape Provinces of South Africa. A geophyte with a bulb that is often gummy, it can reach 20 cm (8 in) in height, and is found growing both on rocky outcrops and in flat areas.

== Subtaxa ==
The following varieties are accepted:

- Oxalis polyphylla var. alba T.M.Salter
- Oxalis polyphylla var. heptaphylla T.M.Salter
- Oxalis polyphylla var. minor T.M.Salter
- Oxalis polyphylla var. pentaphylla (Sims) T.M.Salter
- Oxalis polyphylla var. polyphylla
- Oxalis polyphylla var. pubescens T.M.Salter
