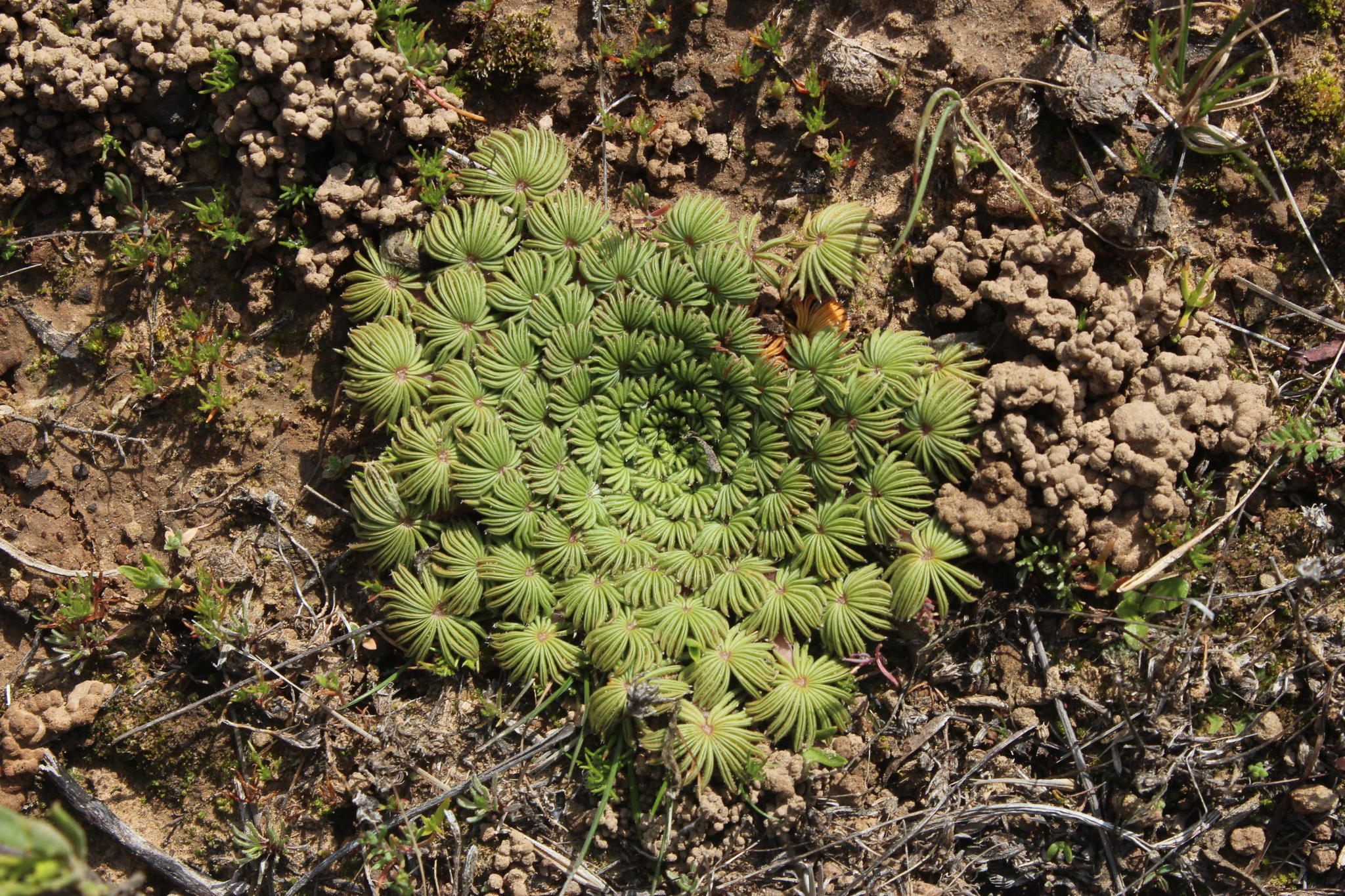

Scientific classification
- Kingdom: Plantae
- Clade: Tracheophytes
- Clade: Angiosperms
- Clade: Eudicots
- Clade: Rosids
- Order: Oxalidales
- Family: Oxalidaceae
- Genus: Oxalis
- Species: O. palmifrons

Binomial name
- Oxalis palmifrons T.M.Salter

= Oxalis palmifrons =

Species of wood sorrel

Oxalis palmifrons is a species of the wood sorrel family, Oxalidaceae, native to South Africa's Northern and Western Cape provinces.

== Description ==
The species exhibits a dark brown bulb, short (2 cm) petioles, and palmate leaflets (over 20 in number). It occasionally flowers with white or yellow petals.

== Habitat ==
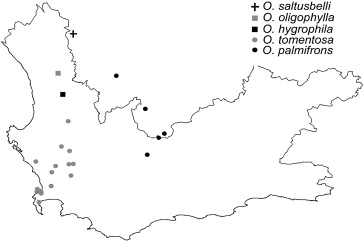
Geographic distribution of species in Oxalis tomentosa alliance, including O. palmifrons. Border depicts Western Cape region of South Africa.

As described by T. M. Salter, the species "grows in flat open spaces and the bulbs, which lie at a depth of about 10 inches, in hard clayey soil, are usually embedded amongst stones". It is endemic to South Africa's Northern and Western Cape provinces.

== Taxonomy ==
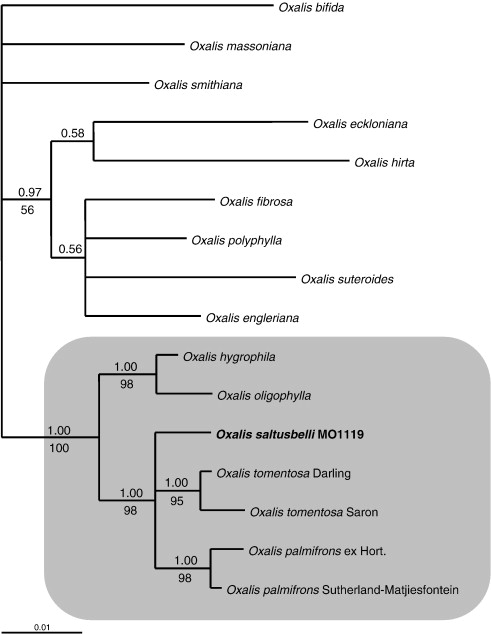
Consensus tree depicting the O. tomentosa alliance, including O. palmifrons.

The species is a member of the Oxalis tomentosa alliance, which includes O. oligophylla Salter, O. hygrophila Dreyer, O. tomentosa L., O. palmifrons Salter, and O. saltusbelli.
