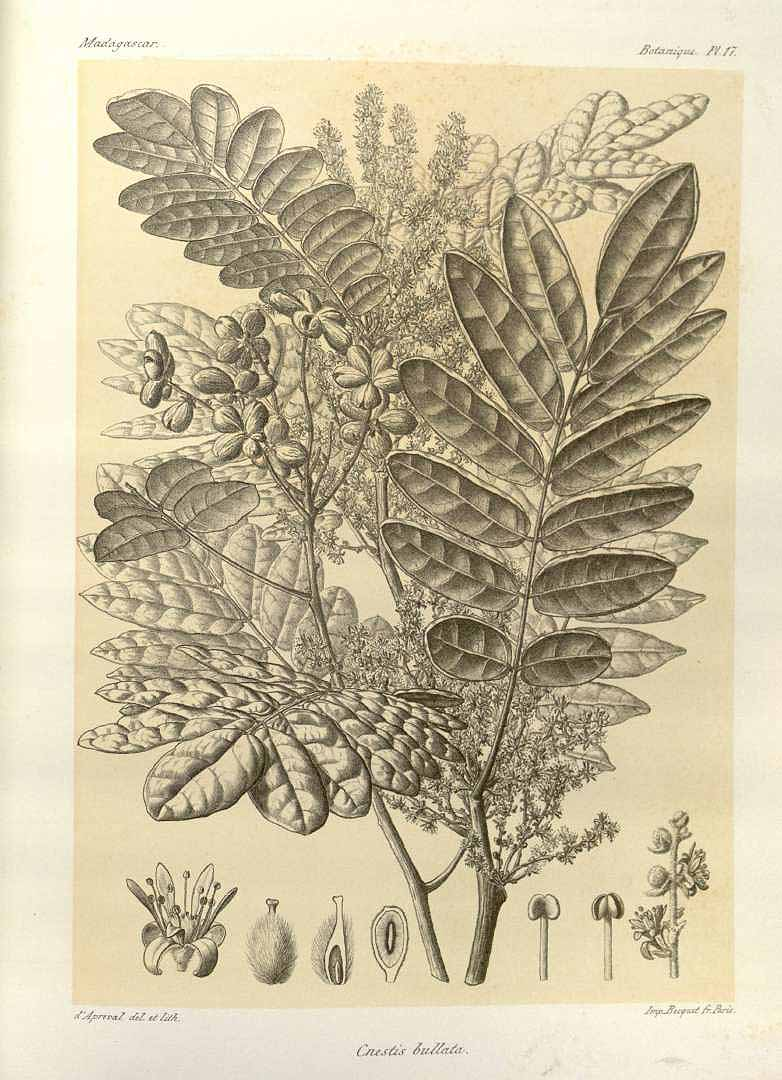

Scientific classification
- Kingdom: Plantae
- Clade: Tracheophytes
- Clade: Angiosperms
- Clade: Eudicots
- Clade: Rosids
- Order: Oxalidales
- Family: Connaraceae
- Genus: Cnestis
- Species: C. polyphylla

Binomial name
- Cnestis polyphylla Lam.

Synonyms
- Cnestis boiviniana Baill. ex Schellenb.; Cnestis borboniensis Raeusch. 03-23; Cnestis bullata Baill.; Cnestis glabra Lam.; Cnestis lurida Baill.; Cnestis madagascariensis Raeusch.; Cnestis natalensis (Hochst.) Planch. & Sond. ex Harv. & Sond.; Cnestis polyphylla var. bullata Baill.; Cnestis scandens J.F.Gmel.; Fagarastrum natalense Walp.; Omphalobium discolor Sond.; Sarmienta cauliflora Sieber; Zanthoxylum natalense Hochst.

= Cnestis polyphylla =

Species of flowering plant in the family Connaraceae

Cnestis polyphylla, or itch pod, is a liane or scrambling shrub belonging to the family Connaraceae and occurring south from Kenya in East Tropical Africa through Mozambique and Zimbabwe to Southern Africa where it is found in coastal and escarpment forest in Limpopo, Mpumalanga, Eswatini and KwaZulu-Natal, and further south to the Eastern Cape. It also grows on the Indian Ocean islands of Madagascar, Mauritius and Réunion. The genus has at least 13 species with many still unresolved. They are distributed mainly in tropical Africa and nearby islands, but extend to SE Asia and China.

Immature leaves are red, ranging through bronze, pale green, mid-green to bluish-green when mature. Leaves are imparipinnate and alternate, with oblong opposite leaflets, having an oblique base and blunt apex, 2.5 – 3 cm long and thinly pubescent below. The small, yellow flowers are crowded in small panicles. Sepals are softly pubescent. The almond-shaped capsule has a hornlike process at its tip, and dehisces by a longitudinal split when mature to reveal large, shiny, blackish-brown seeds with a basal yellowish aril. The capsules are covered inside and out with rigid reddish-brown hairs which penetrate human skin with ease and cause intense itching.

All parts of the plant are rich in the potent neurotoxin glabrin, causing convulsions in most animals, and leading to its use as a fish poison. Extracts from the leaves are used for treating skin diseases. The protein methionine sulfoximine is common in the family Connaraceae and other toxic compounds have yet to be identified. The roots of some Connarus species are known to contain the glycosides rapanone, embelin and bergenin.
