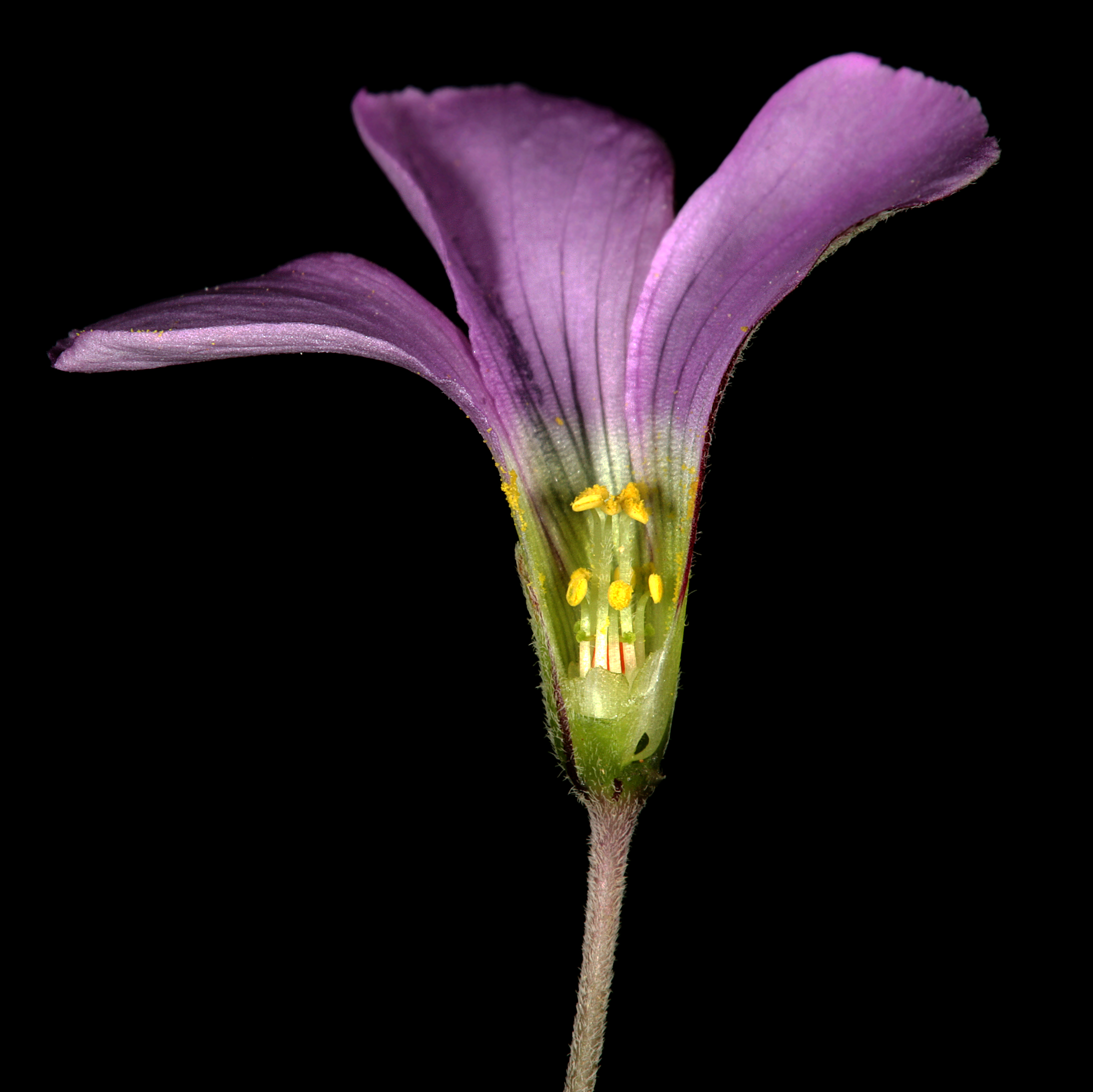
- Flower of Oxalis bifida

Scientific classification
- Kingdom: Plantae
- Clade: Tracheophytes
- Clade: Angiosperms
- Clade: Eudicots
- Clade: Rosids
- Order: Oxalidales
- Family: Oxalidaceae
- Genus: Oxalis
- Species: O. bifida

Binomial name
- Oxalis bifida Thunb.

= Oxalis bifida =

Species of plant

Oxalis bifida is a species of plant. The species was originally described by Carl Peter Thunberg in 1794.

== Description ==
A geophyte.

== Range ==
Endemic to the Western Cape of South Africa.

== Habitat ==
A shade loving plant.

== Ecology ==
Is susceptible to an anther-smut fungus (Thecaphora capensis).

== Uses ==
Edible.

== Taxonomy ==
Described by Carl Peter Thunberg in 1781.
