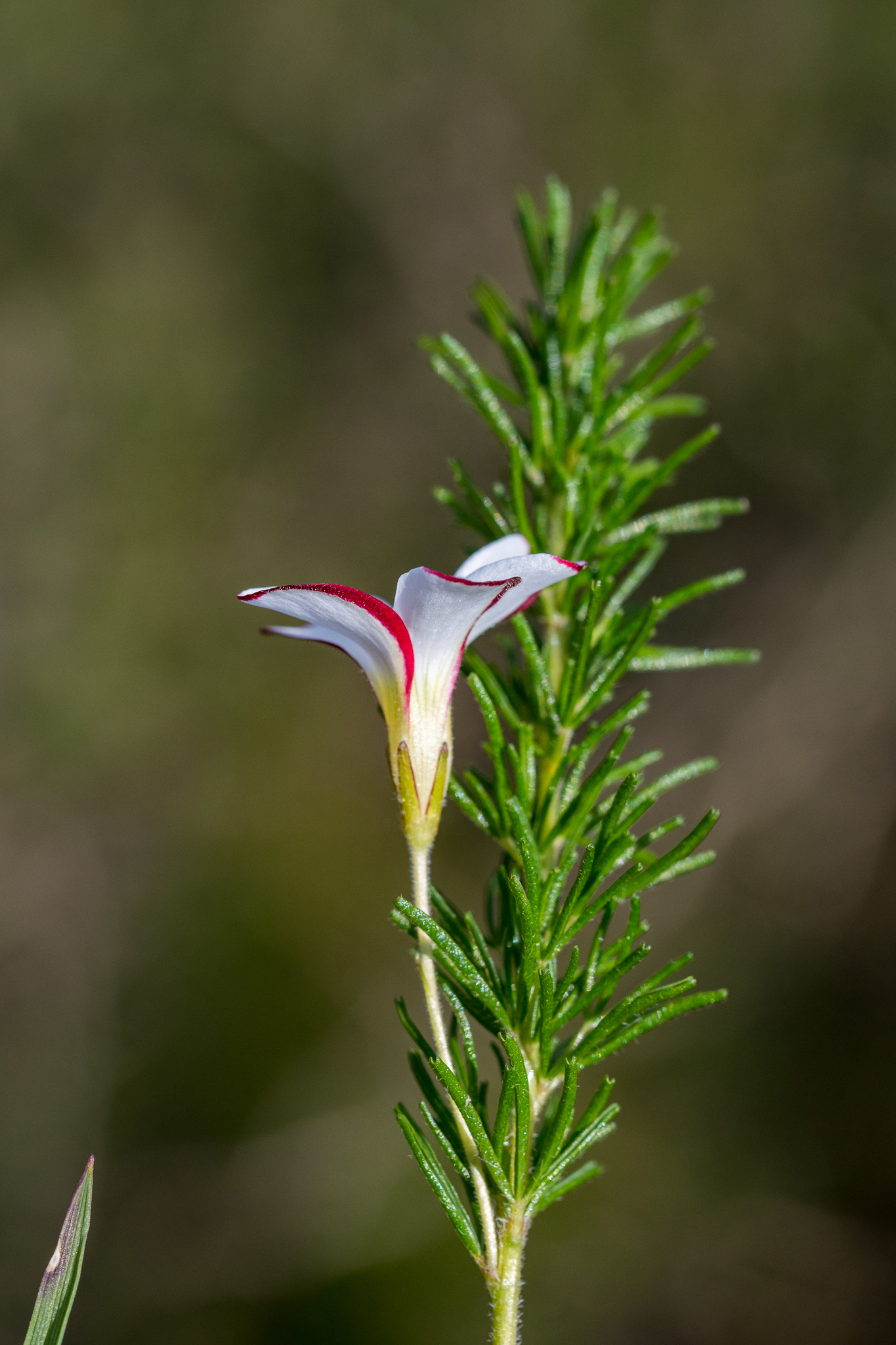

Scientific classification
- Kingdom: Plantae
- Clade: Tracheophytes
- Clade: Angiosperms
- Clade: Eudicots
- Clade: Rosids
- Order: Oxalidales
- Family: Oxalidaceae
- Genus: Oxalis
- Species: O. tenuifolia

Binomial name
- Oxalis tenuifolia Jacq.

= Oxalis tenuifolia =

Species of plant

Oxalis tenuifolia, also known by its common name thinleaf sorrel, is a species from the genus Oxalis. The plant was first described by Christian Friedrich Ecklon and Karl Ludwig Philipp Zeyher.
