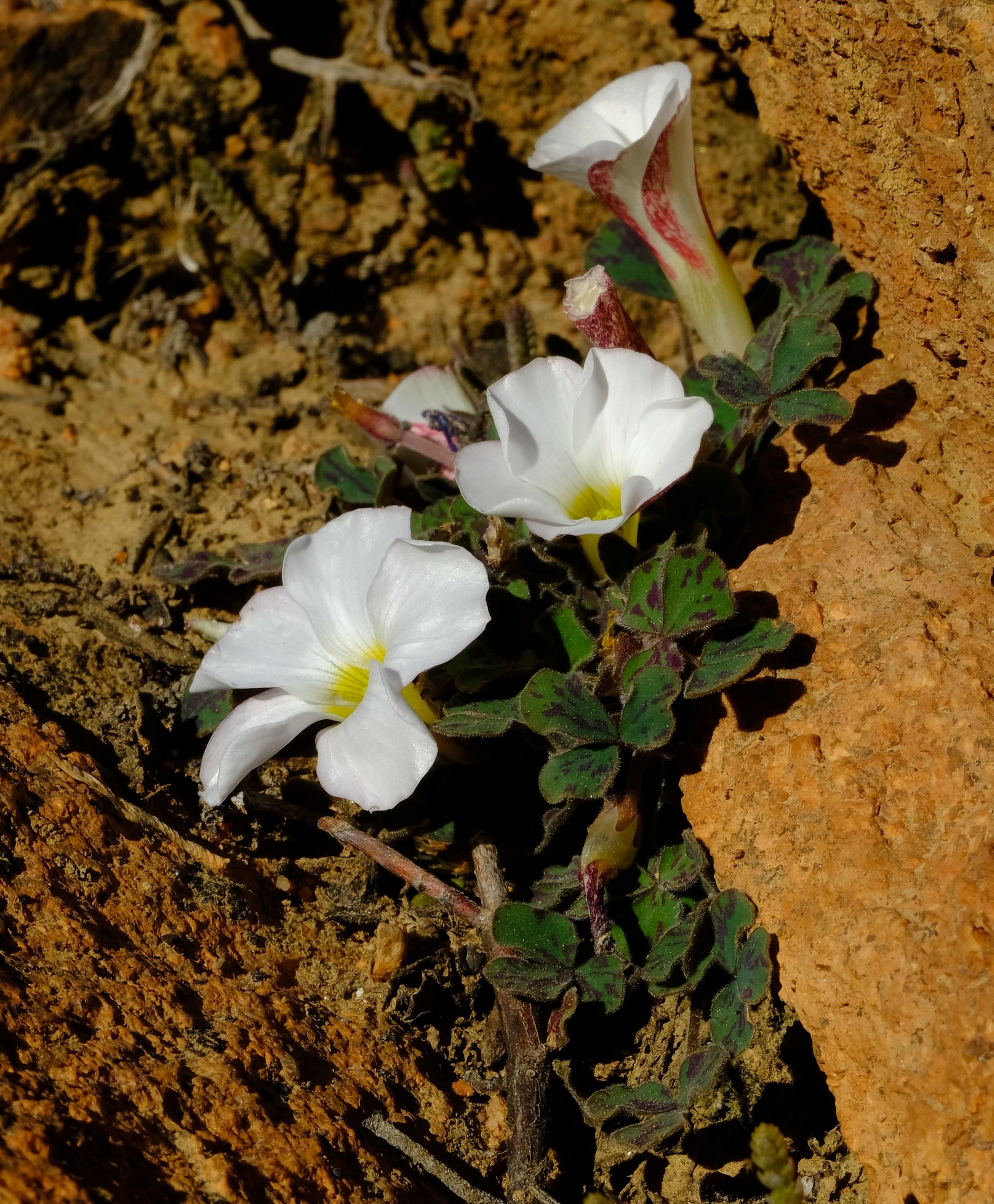

Scientific classification
- Kingdom: Plantae
- Clade: Tracheophytes
- Clade: Angiosperms
- Clade: Eudicots
- Clade: Rosids
- Order: Oxalidales
- Family: Oxalidaceae
- Genus: Oxalis
- Species: O. ambigua

Binomial name
- Oxalis ambigua Jacq.

= Oxalis ambigua =

Species of flowering plant

Oxalis ambigua is a species from the subgenus Oxalis.

== Taxonomy ==
The taxon name Oxalis ambigua was first described by Nikolaus Joseph von Jacquin. Different ranking exists. The species is either from the subgenus Oxalis or from the genus Oxalis.

== Range ==
Recent observations suggest that Oxalis ambigua is currently primarily found in South Africa. Botanic expedition in the 19th century also mention observations in New Zealand.
