= Oxalis truncatula =

Scientific classification
- Kingdom: Plantae
- Clade: Tracheophytes
- Clade: Angiosperms
- Clade: Eudicots
- Clade: Rosids
- Order: Oxalidales
- Family: Oxalidaceae
- Genus: Oxalis
- Species: O. truncatula

Binomial name
- Oxalis truncatula Jacq.

Synonyms
- Acetosella holosericea Kuntze; Acetosella truncatula (Jacq.) Kuntze; Oxalis crassifolia Eckl. & Zeyh.; Oxalis cruentata Eckl. & Zeyh.; Oxalis holosericea Sond.; Oxalis sonderi R.Knuth

Species of plant

Oxalis truncatula, the hairyback sorrel, is a species of flowering plant in the family Oxalidaceae. It is native to the southwestern Cape Provinces of South Africa. A tuberous geophyte, it is typically found in hard, rocky soils, and infrequently on the slopes of mountains.
