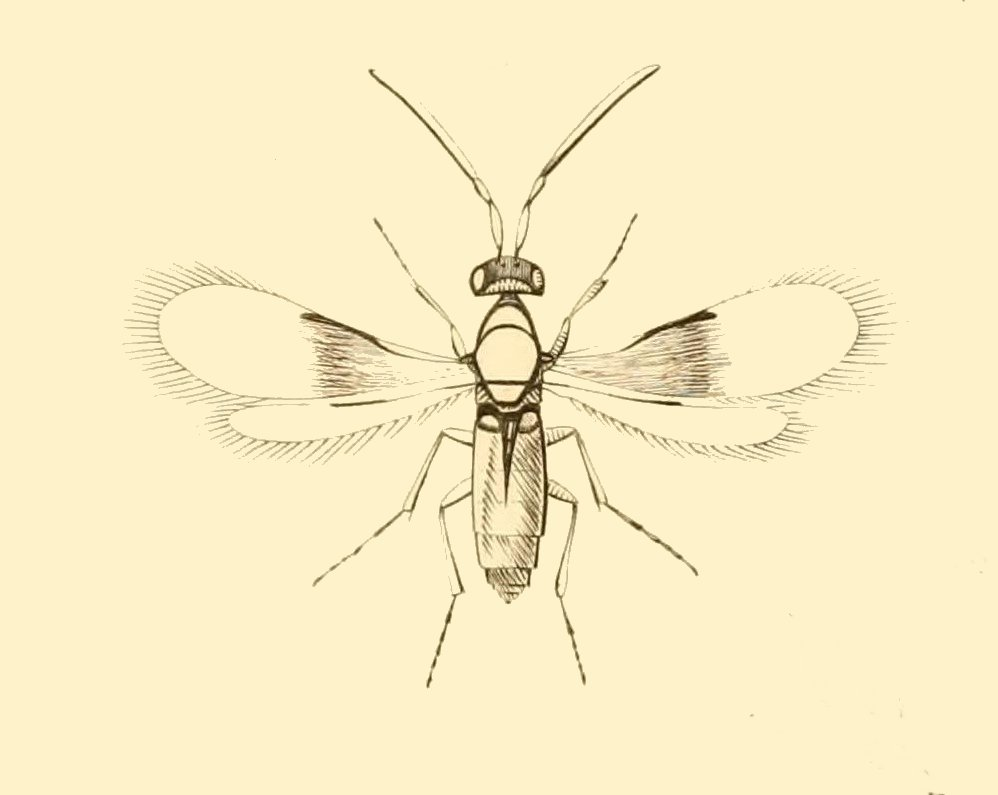
- Thysanus ater Walker, 1840 (Signiphoridae) ♂

Scientific classification
- Kingdom: Animalia
- Phylum: Arthropoda
- Class: Insecta
- Order: Hymenoptera
- Family: Signiphoridae
- Genus: Thysanus; Walker, 1840

Synonyms
- Plastocharis Forster, 1856; Triphasius Forster, 1856; Thusanus Walker, 1872 (Missp.); Neosigniphora Rust, 1913

= Thysanus (wasp) =

Genus of insects

Thysanus is a genus of parasitoid wasps belonging to the family Signiphoridae.

The genus has almost cosmopolitan distribution.

== Selected species ==
- Thysanus ater Walker, 1840
- Thysanus coleoptratus Kerrich, 1953
