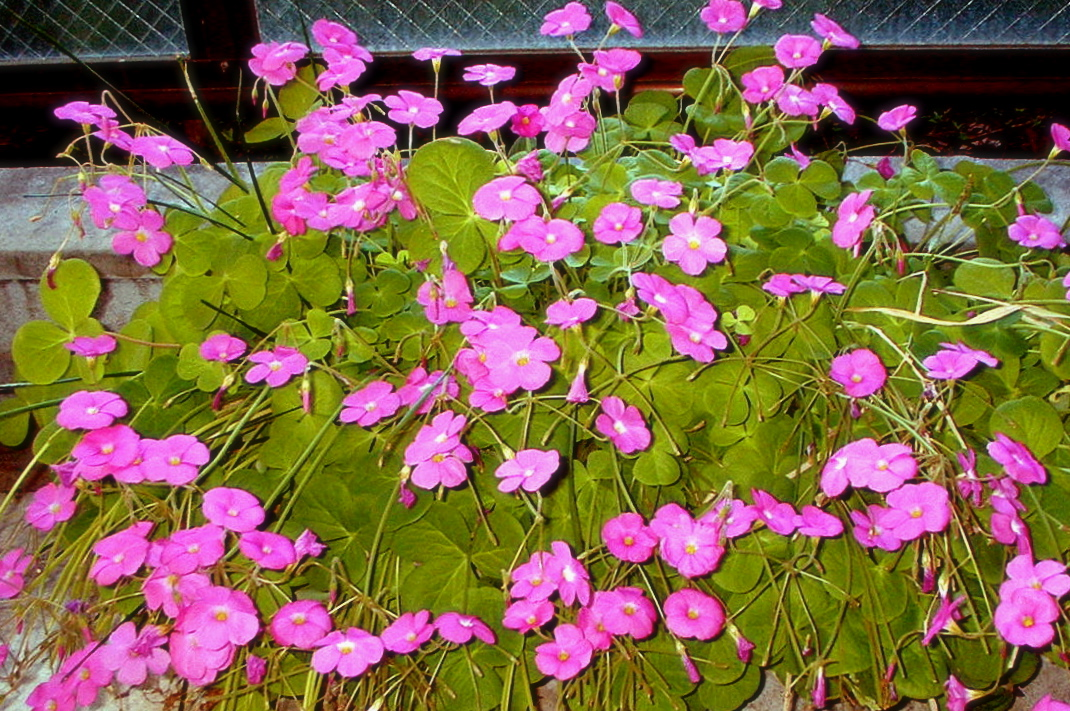

Scientific classification
- Kingdom: Plantae
- Clade: Tracheophytes
- Clade: Angiosperms
- Clade: Eudicots
- Clade: Rosids
- Order: Oxalidales
- Family: Oxalidaceae
- Genus: Oxalis
- Species: O. bowiei

Binomial name
- Oxalis bowiei W.T.Aiton ex G.Don

= Oxalis bowiei =

Bowie's wood-sorrel

Species of flowering plant

Oxalis bowiei, Bowie's wood-sorrel, red-flower woodsorrel, or Cape shamrock, is a plant from the genus Oxalis, which is native to what was Cape Province and KwaZulu-Natal in South Africa. It has also been naturalized in Australia.

It is named after James Bowie who collected plants for the Royal Botanic Gardens, Kew at the beginning of the 19th century.

Its flowering stems may be a foot or more in height and are produced continuously for a considerable length of time during summer.
