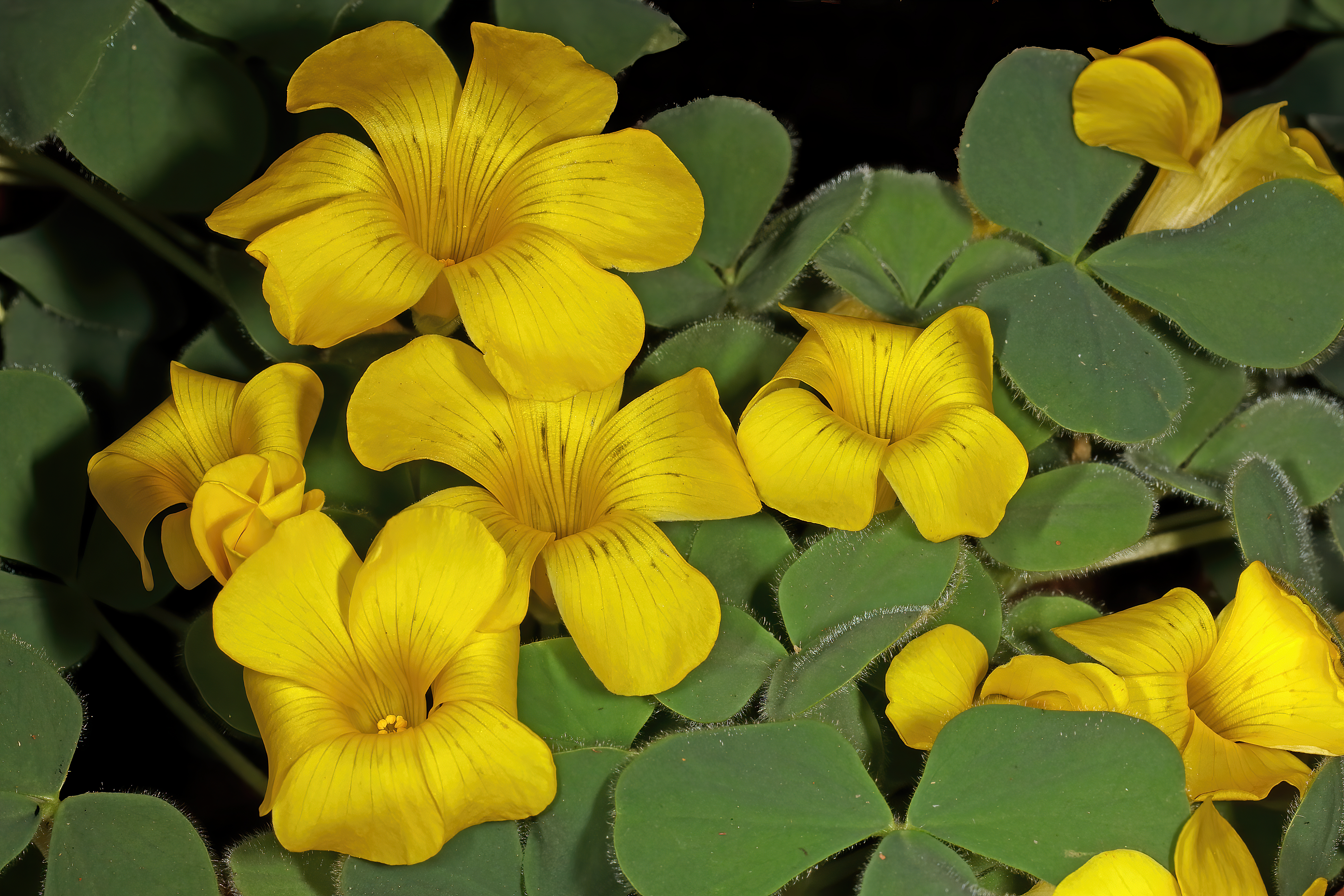

Scientific classification
- Kingdom: Plantae
- Clade: Tracheophytes
- Clade: Angiosperms
- Clade: Eudicots
- Clade: Rosids
- Order: Oxalidales
- Family: Oxalidaceae
- Genus: Oxalis
- Species: O. melanosticta

Binomial name
- Oxalis melanosticta Sond.

Synonyms
- Acetosella melanosticta (Sond.) Kuntze

= Oxalis melanosticta =

Species of plant in the genus Oxalis

Oxalis melanosticta, the black-spotted wood sorrel, is a species of flowering plant in the family Oxalidaceae, native to the southwestern Cape Provinces of South Africa. Its cultivar 'Ken Aslet' has gained the Royal Horticultural Society's Award of Garden Merit.
