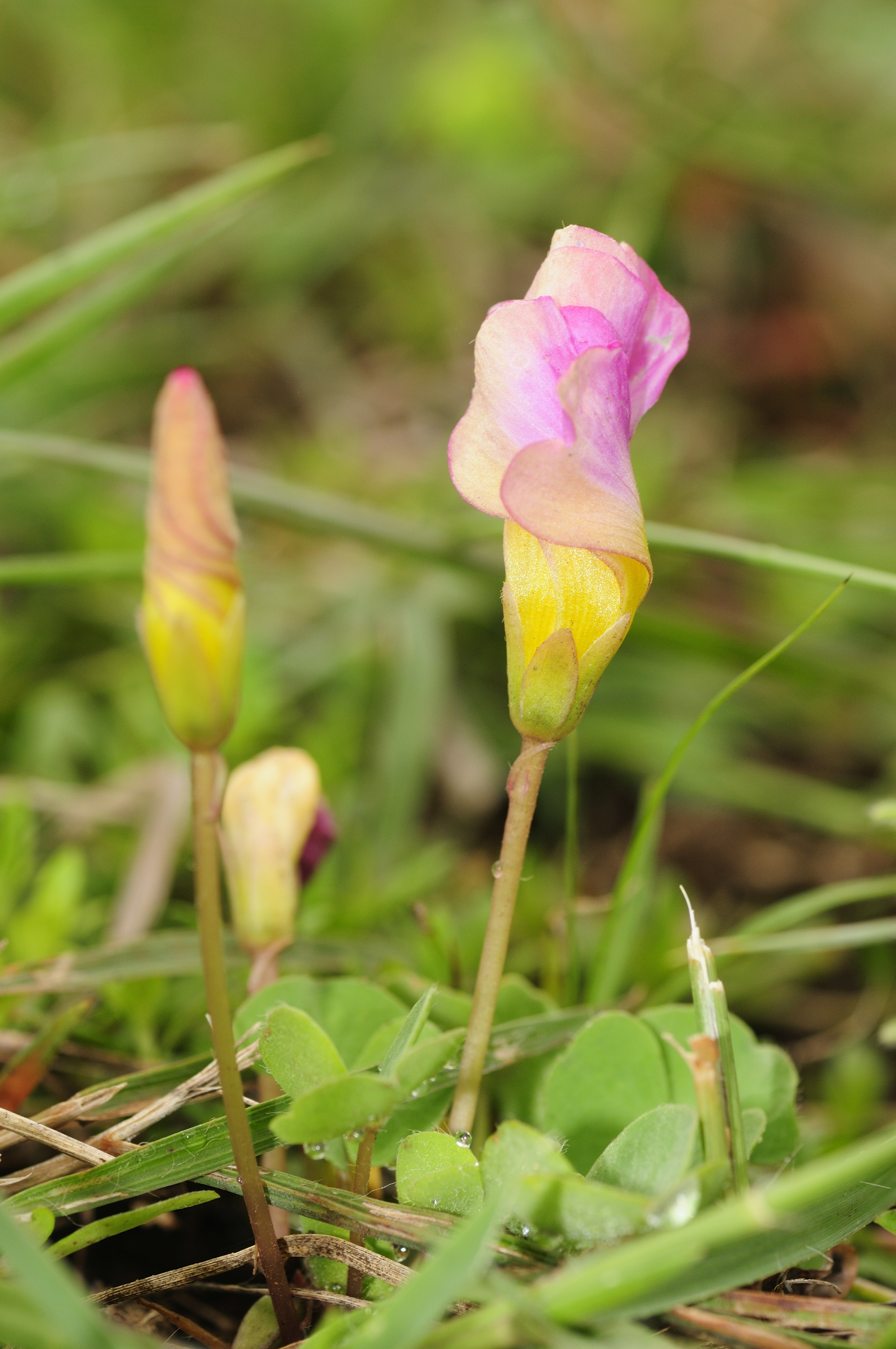

Scientific classification
- Kingdom: Plantae
- Clade: Tracheophytes
- Clade: Angiosperms
- Clade: Eudicots
- Clade: Rosids
- Order: Oxalidales
- Family: Oxalidaceae
- Genus: Oxalis
- Species: O. obliquifolia

Binomial name
- Oxalis obliquifolia Steud. ex A. Rich.

= Oxalis obliquifolia =

Species of flowering plant

Oxalis obliquifolia is an Oxalis species found from Ethiopia to South Africa.

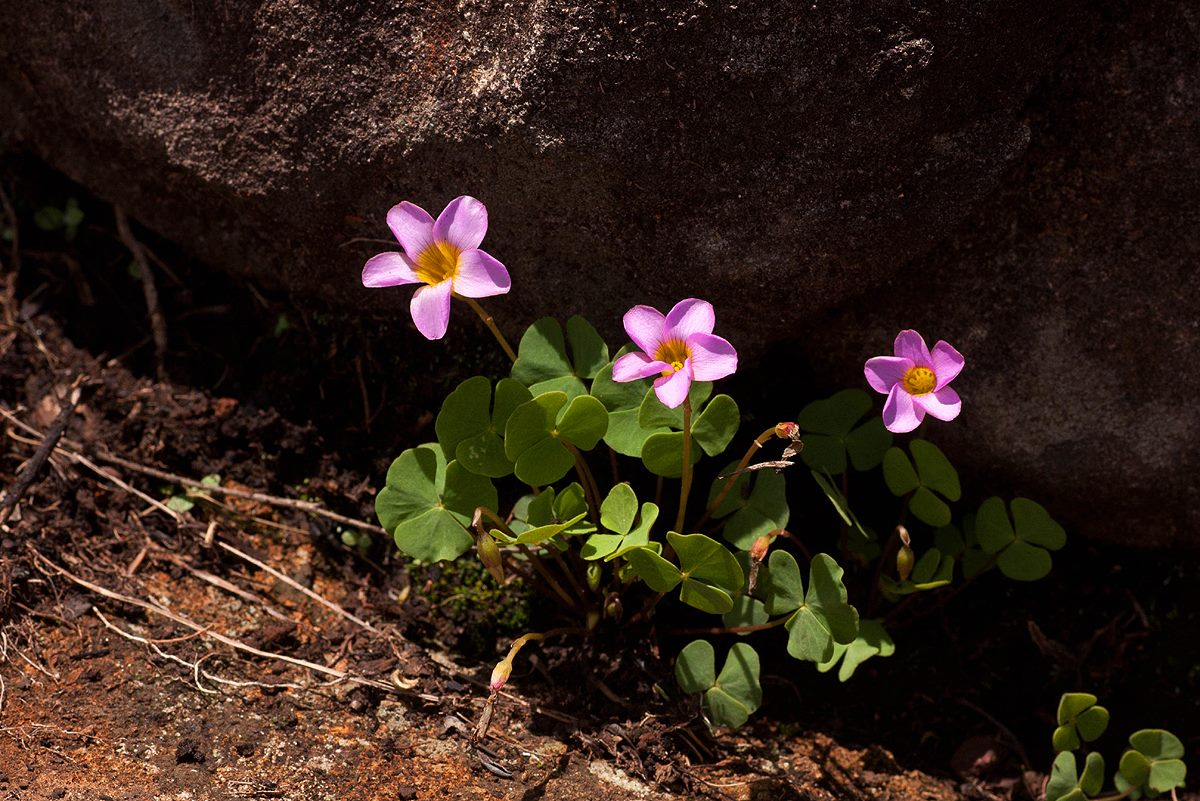
