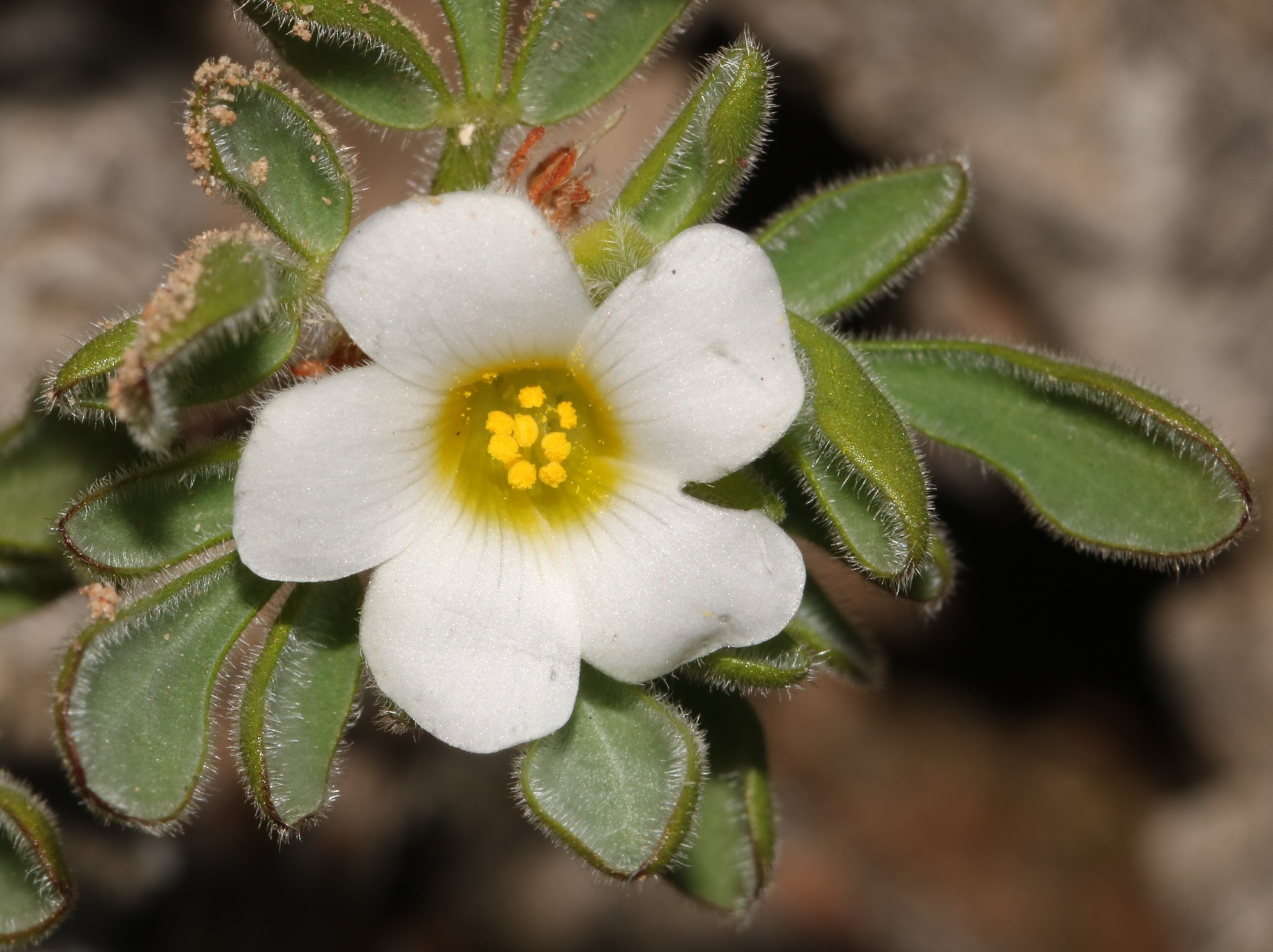

Scientific classification
- Kingdom: Plantae
- Clade: Tracheophytes
- Clade: Angiosperms
- Clade: Eudicots
- Clade: Rosids
- Order: Oxalidales
- Family: Oxalidaceae
- Genus: Oxalis
- Species: O. virginea

Binomial name
- Oxalis virginea Jacquin

= Oxalis virginea =

Species of plant

Oxalis virginea, commonly known as Virgin sorrel, is a species from the genus Oxalis. It is endemic to South Africa. O. virginea was first described by Nikolaus Joseph von Jacquin in 1798. This species is apparently lacking a type specimen.

== Description ==
Oxalis virginea has a stem of 1 to 4 cm in length, often branched, and densely hairy. In cultivation the stem can be longer. It is single flowered, terminal, with hairy peduncles, barely 1cm long. Each peduncle has two bracts. The flowers are white, 1.3–1.5 cm long, and hairy.

== Range ==
This species is found in South Africa.

== Conservation status ==
Oxalis virginea is regarded as being rare but not threatened.

== Gallery ==
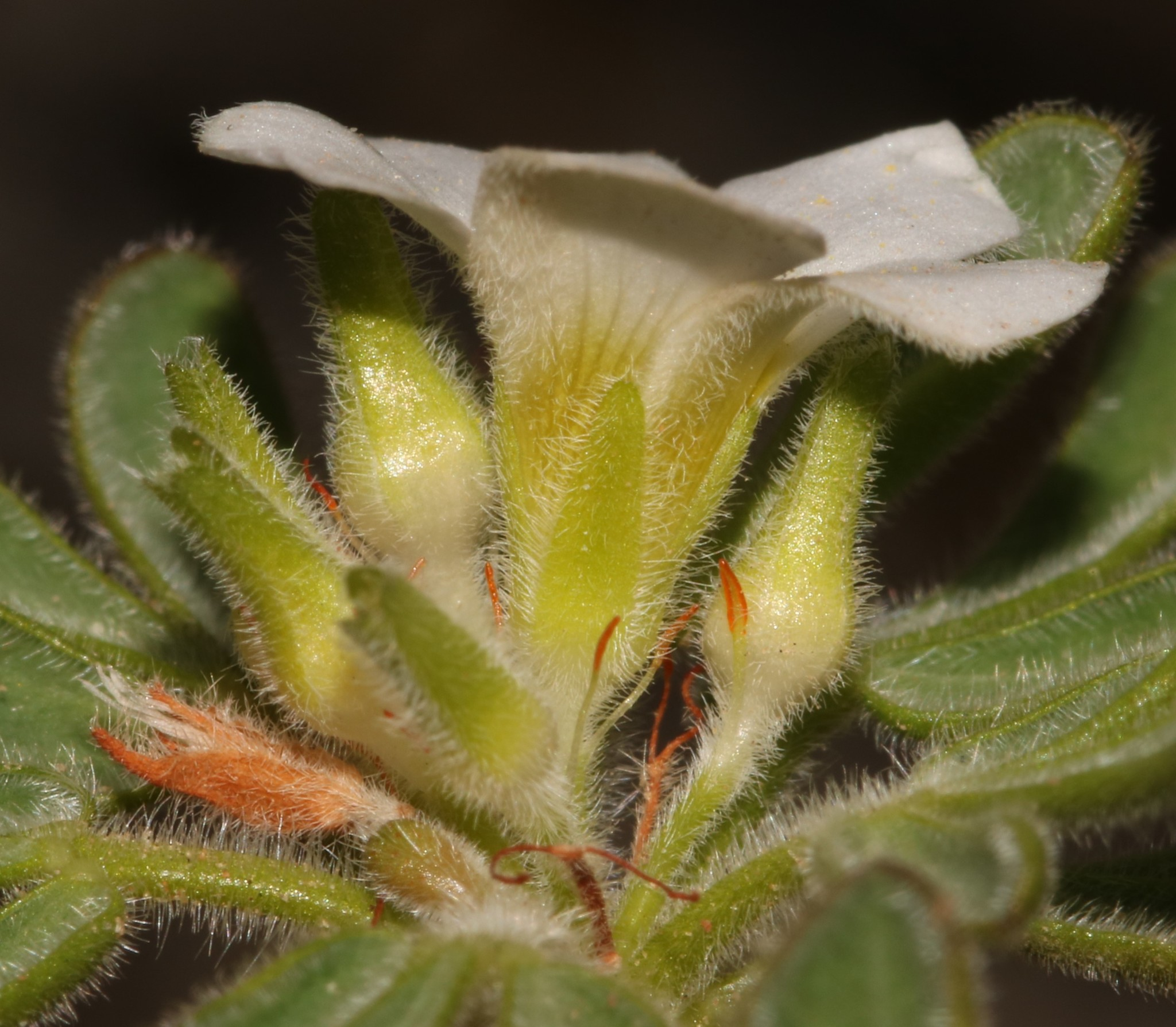

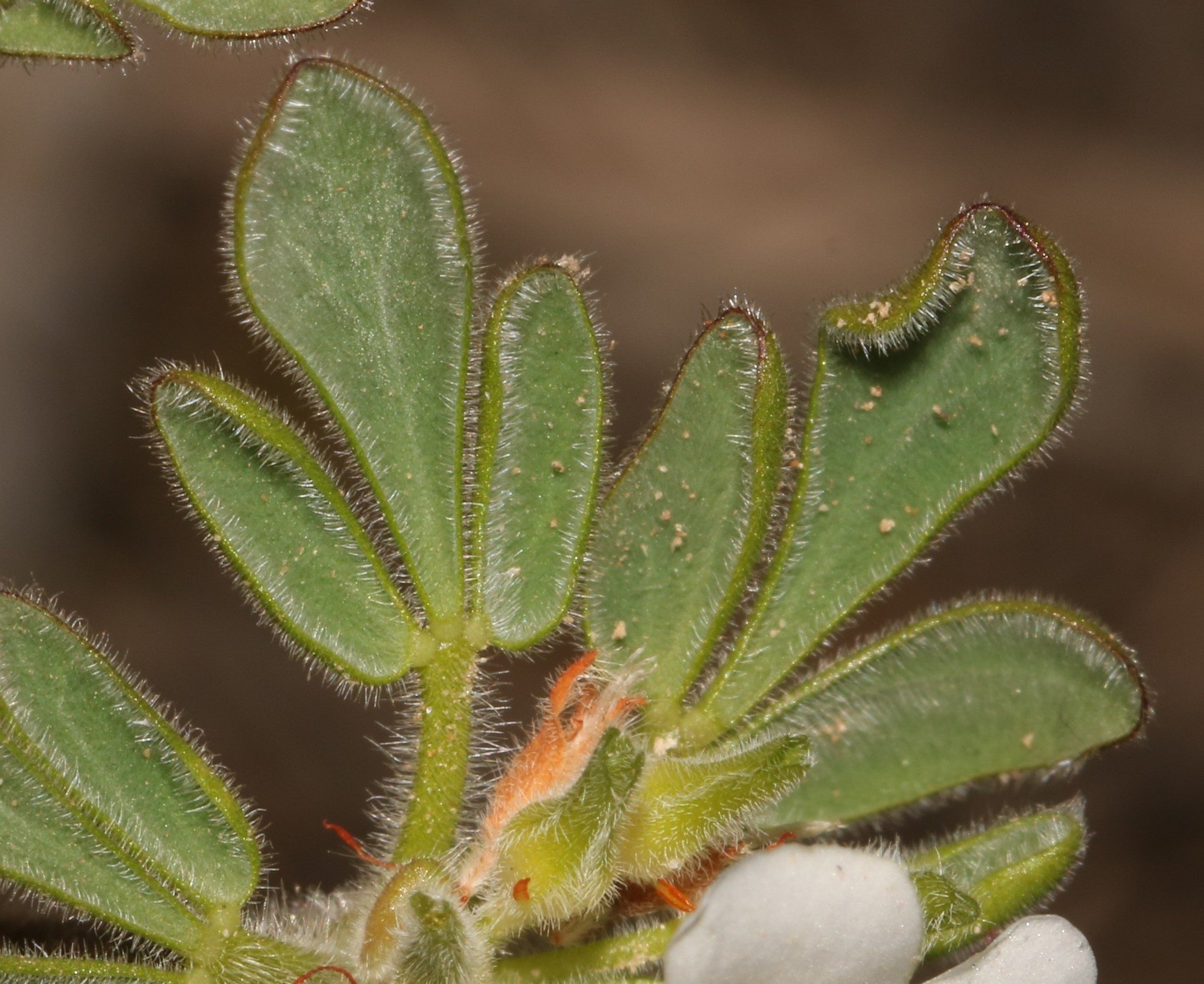

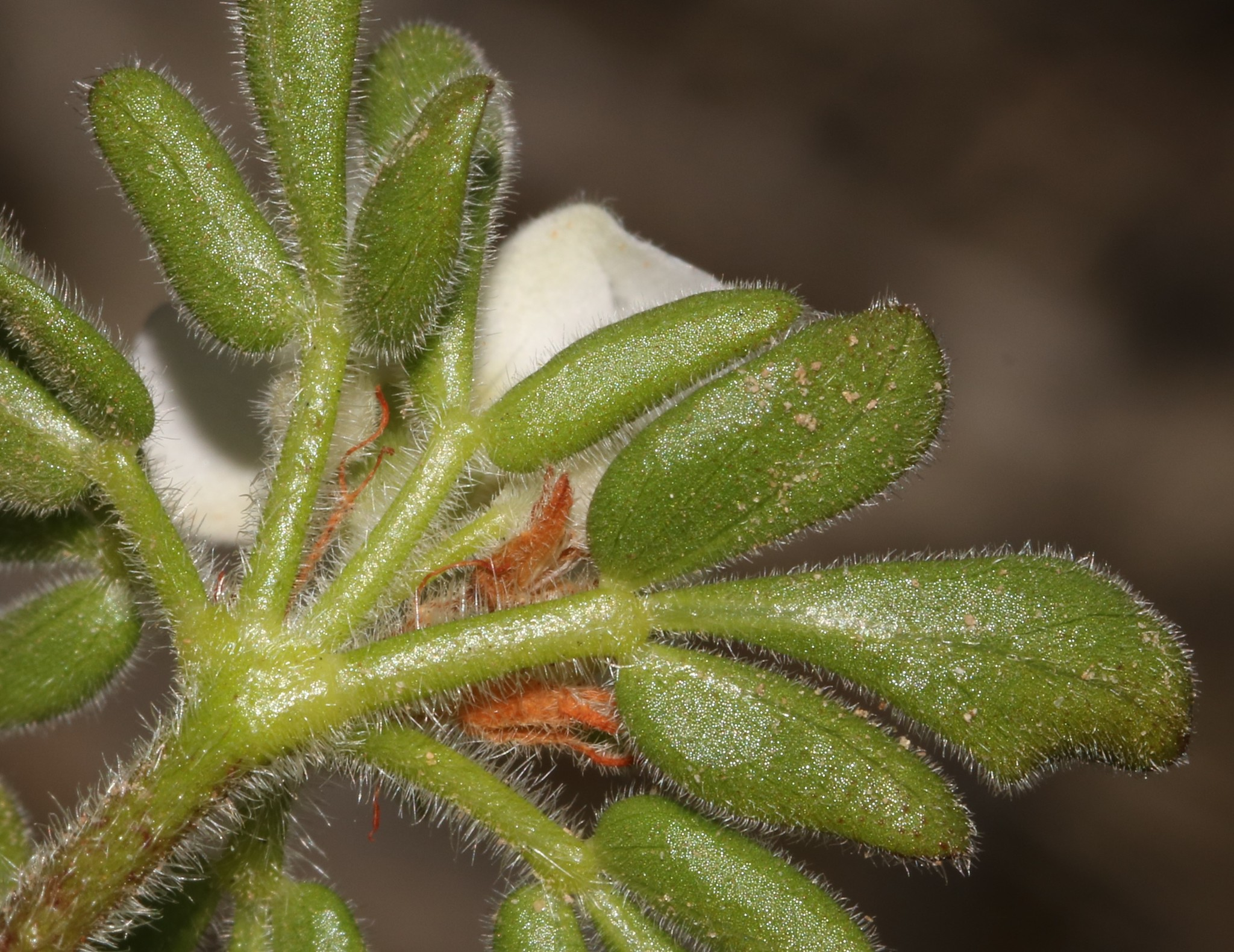
