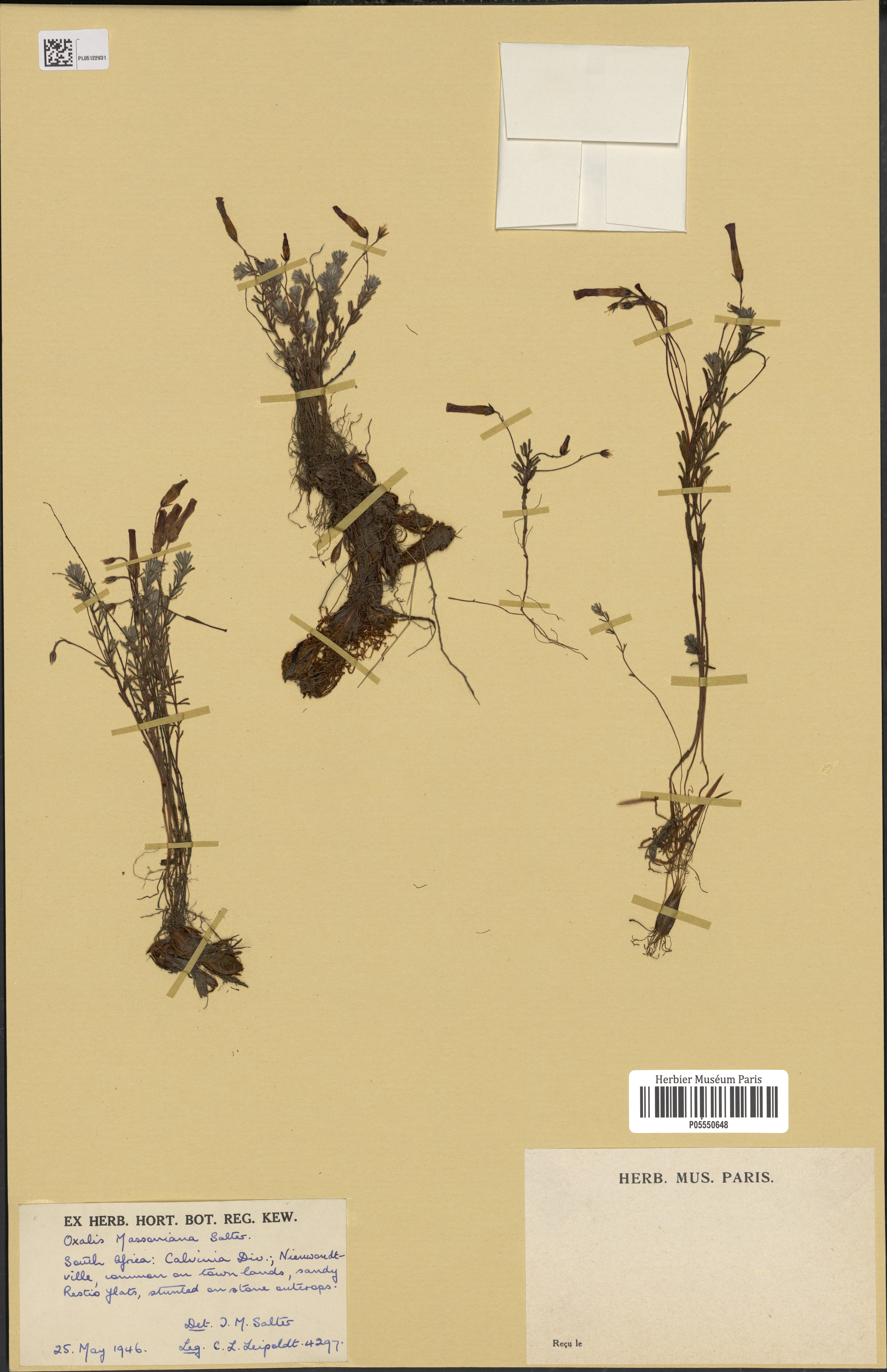

Scientific classification
- Kingdom: Plantae
- Clade: Embryophytes
- Clade: Tracheophytes
- Clade: Angiosperms
- Clade: Eudicots
- Clade: Rosids
- Order: Oxalidales
- Family: Oxalidaceae
- Genus: Oxalis
- Species: O. massoniana

Binomial name
- Oxalis massoniana T.M.Salter

= Oxalis massoniana =

Species of flowering plant

Oxalis massoniana, Masson's wood sorrel, is a species of flowering plant in the family Oxalidaceae, native only to Van Rhyns Pass, South Africa. It has gained the Royal Horticultural Society's Award of Garden Merit.
