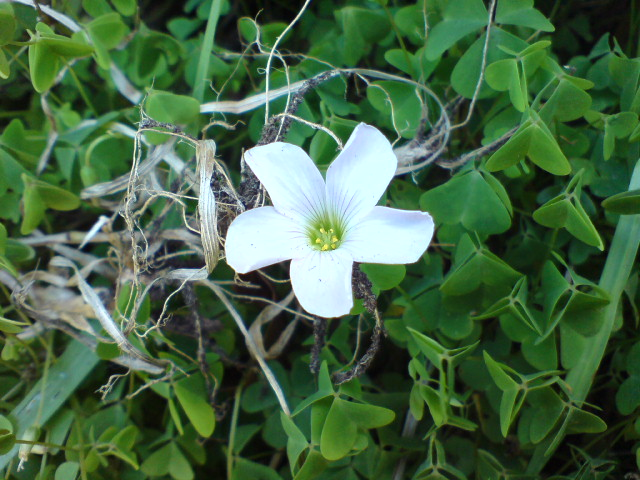

Scientific classification
- Kingdom: Plantae
- Clade: Tracheophytes
- Clade: Angiosperms
- Clade: Eudicots
- Clade: Rosids
- Order: Oxalidales
- Family: Oxalidaceae
- Genus: Oxalis
- Species: O. incarnata

Binomial name
- Oxalis incarnata L.

= Oxalis incarnata =

Species of flowering plant

Oxalis incarnata is a species of flowering plant in the woodsorrel family known by the common names pale pink-sorrel and crimson woodsorrel. It is native to southern Africa, but it can be found on other continents where it is an introduced species, often the descendant of garden escapees. It is grown and kept as an ornamental plant. This is a perennial herb growing from a system of rhizomes and bulbs. The branching, hairless stem grows to nearly 30 centimeters in maximum length. There may be small bulblets located along the stem above ground. The leaves are borne on long petioles in erect bunches, each leaf made up of three leaflets. The solitary flower arises on a peduncle. Each flower has five white to light pink petals.
