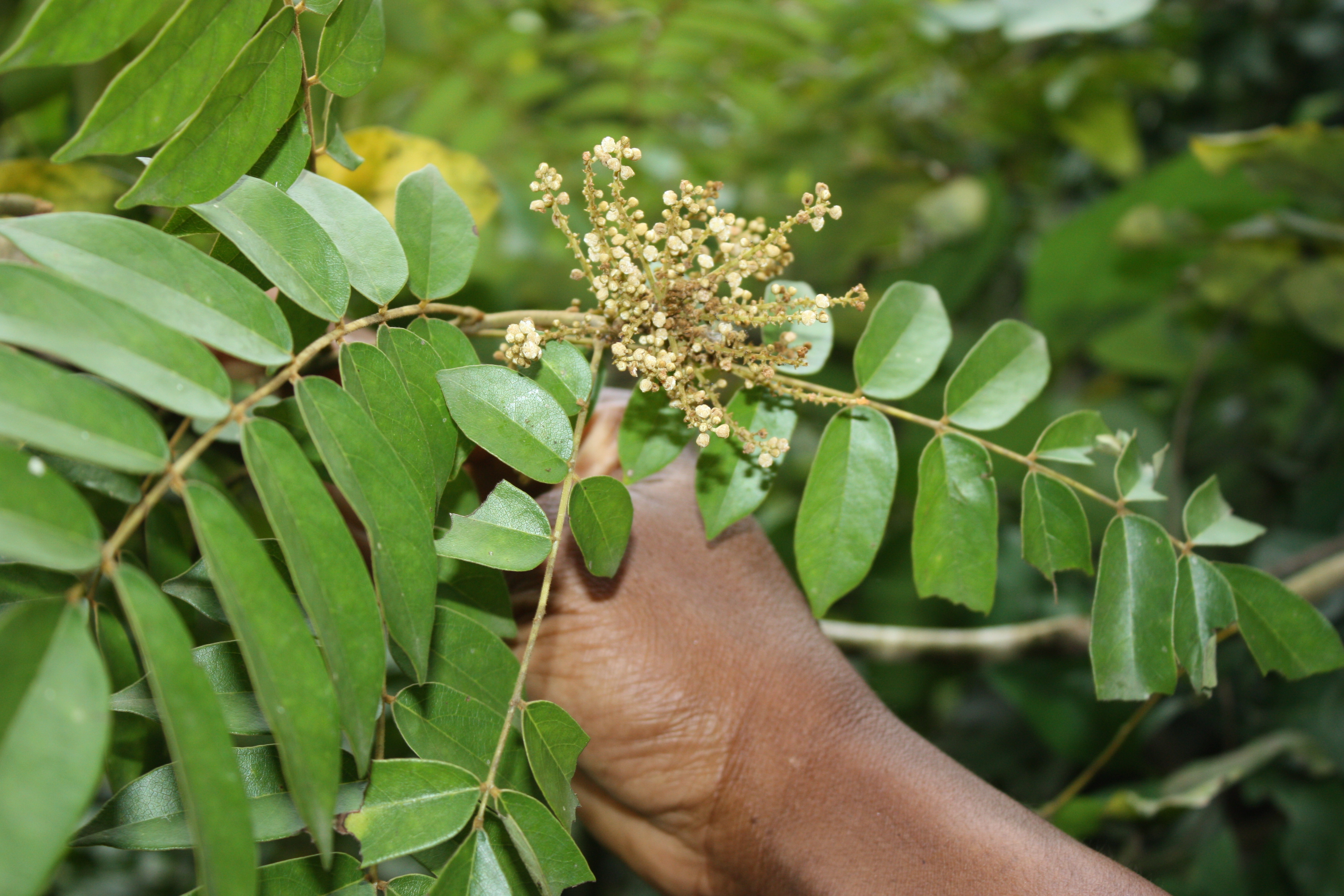
- Cnestis ferruginea

Scientific classification
- Kingdom: Plantae
- Clade: Tracheophytes
- Clade: Angiosperms
- Clade: Eudicots
- Clade: Rosids
- Order: Oxalidales
- Family: Connaraceae
- Genus: Cnestis; Juss.

= Cnestis =

Genus of flowering plants

Cnestis is a genus of flowering plants belonging to the family Connaraceae.

Its native range is Tropical and Southern Africa to Malesia.

Species:

- Cnestis bomiensis Lemmens
- Cnestis corniculata Lam.
- Cnestis ferruginea Vahl ex DC.
- Cnestis macrantha Baill.
- Cnestis macrophylla Gilg ex G.Schellenb.
- Cnestis mannii (Baker) G.Schellenb.
- Cnestis mildbraedii Gilg
- Cnestis palala (Lour.) Merr.
- Cnestis polyphylla Lam.
- Cnestis racemosa G.Don
- Cnestis uncata Lemmens
- Cnestis urens Gilg
- Cnestis yangambiensis Louis ex Troupin
