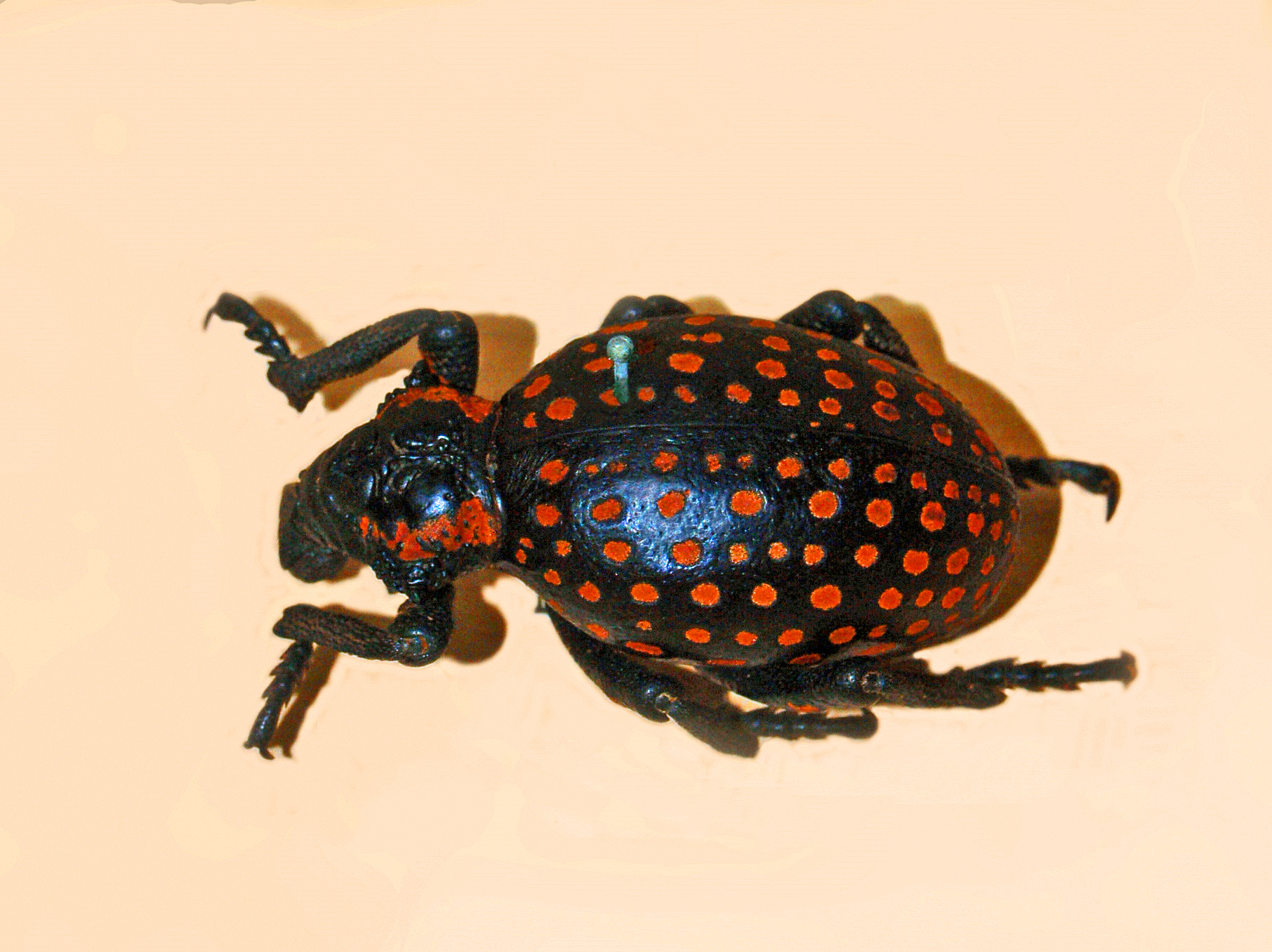
- Brachycerus ornatus from South-Western Africa

Scientific classification
- Kingdom: Animalia
- Phylum: Arthropoda
- Clade: Pancrustacea
- Class: Insecta
- Order: Coleoptera
- Suborder: Polyphaga
- Infraorder: Cucujiformia
- Superfamily: Curculionoidea
- Family: Brachyceridae
- Genus: Brachycerus
- Species: B. ornatus

Binomial name
- Brachycerus ornatus Westwood, 1837

= Brachycerus ornatus =

Species of beetle

Brachycerus ornatus, common name red-spotted lily weevil or moose face lily weevil, is a species of family Curculionidae, subfamily Brachycerinae.

== Description ==
Brachycerus ornatus reaches a length of about 25–45 millimetres (0.98–1.77 in). The body is black, with red spots and markings. The abdomen is quite rounded and the pronotum is strongly ridged, with round tubercles. Adult beetles feed on foliage of lily ( Ammocharis coranica) and females lay eggs in burrows close to the bulbs, while larvae feed on the bulbs and pupate in the soil.

== Distribution ==
This species occurs in regions of Sub-Saharan Africa; it is common in Tanzania. It breeds oftenest in areas where the soil is clay.
