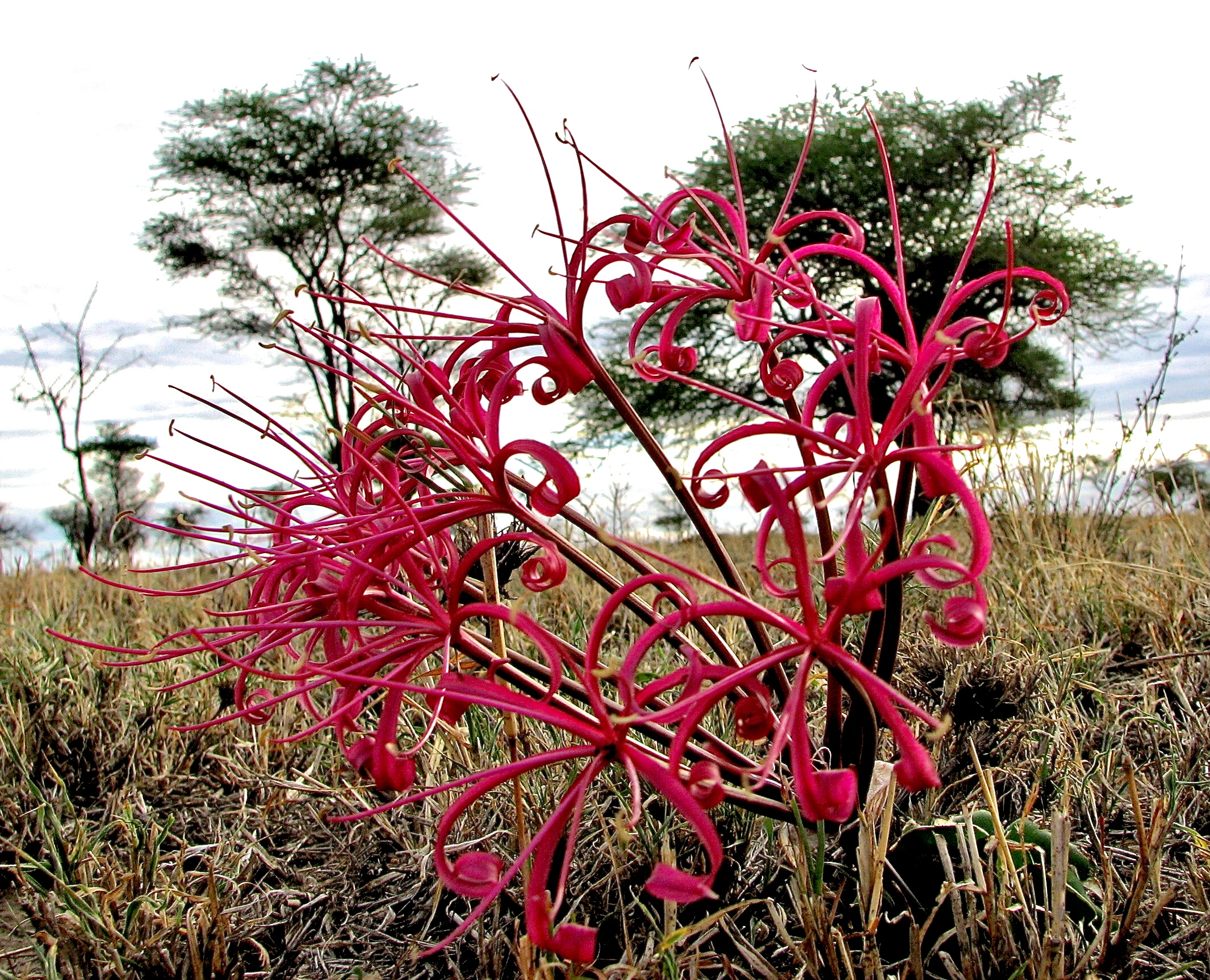
- Ammocharis tinneana

Scientific classification
- Kingdom: Plantae
- Clade: Embryophytes
- Clade: Tracheophytes
- Clade: Angiosperms
- Clade: Monocots
- Order: Asparagales
- Family: Amaryllidaceae
- Subfamily: Amaryllidoideae
- Subtribe: Crininae
- Genus: Ammocharis; Herb.

Synonyms
- Cybistetes Milne-Redh. & Schweick.

= Ammocharis =

Genus of flowering plants

Ammocharis is a small genus from sub-Saharan Africa, in the family Amaryllidaceae (subfamily Amaryllidoideae) which includes seven species distributed in Africa. The plant grows as above-ground bulb, preferring seasonally wet, hot, sandy soils and full sun.

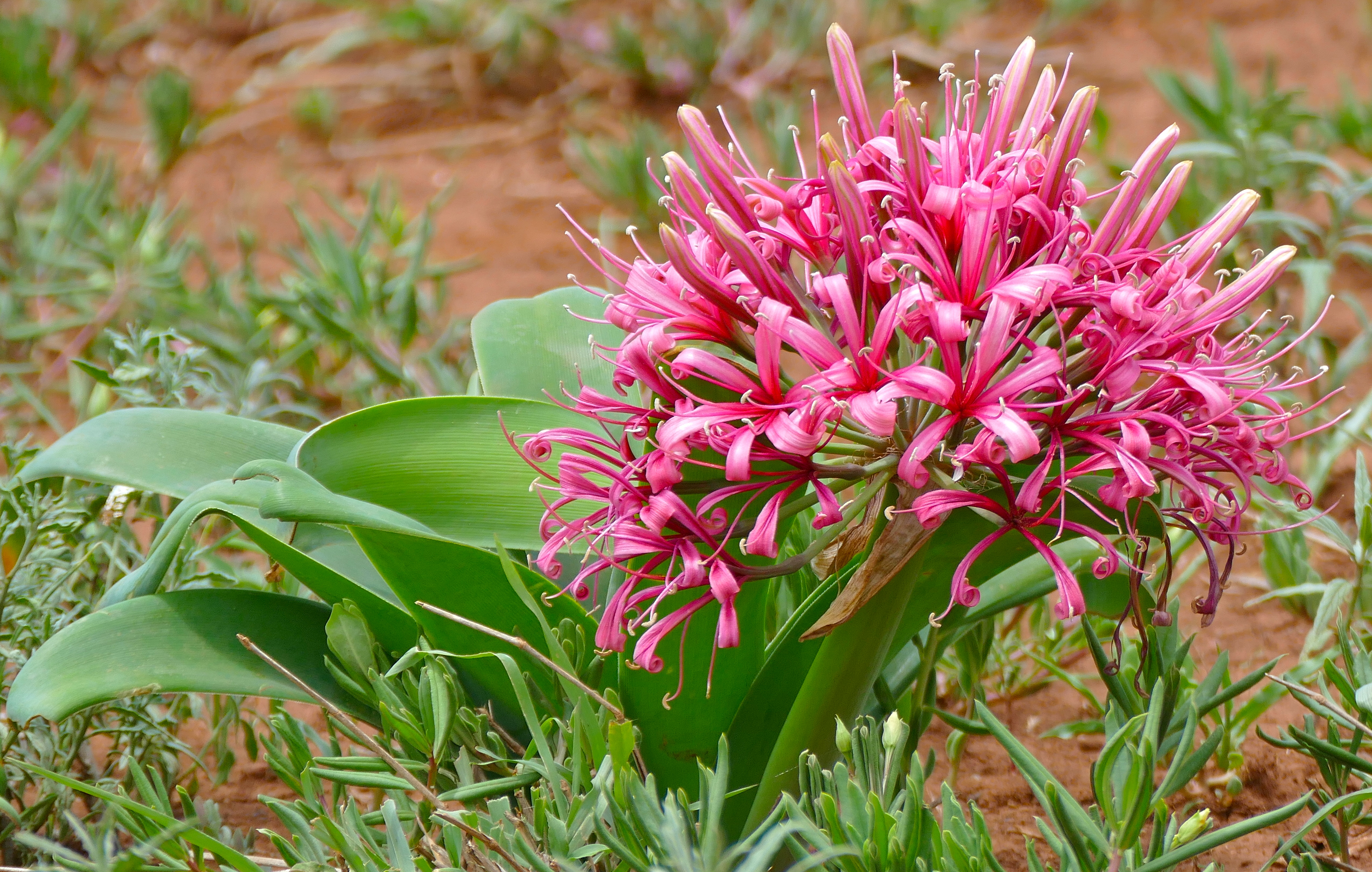
Ammocharis coranica

== Taxonomy ==
The botanist William Herbert segregated Ammocharis from Crinum in 1821, with two species, A. coranica and A. falcata (both originally Amaryllis). He also placed one of Linnaeus' original Amaryllis species, A. longifolia, in Crinum as C. capense. This species would also eventually find its way into Ammocharis. In 1847 Roemer placed Amaryllis longifolia in Ammocharis as Ammocharis longifolfolia, (Linn.) Roem. without realising it was conspecific with Ammocharis falcata. However, many subsequent authors included only the two original species.

A major review of the genus was undertaken by Milne-Redhead and Schweickerdt in 1939. In their recircumscription they identified five species. With respect to A. longifolia=falcata they concluded that while very closely related, it was sufficiently distinct as to deserve of generic status, coining the term Cybistetes Ancient Greek: κυβιστητης, or tumbler, after the way the wind tumbles the infructescence. From then onwards Cybistetes was treated as a separate genus.

With the development of molecular phylogenetics, Meerow et al. established Amaryllideae and its subtribe Crininae as monophyletic taxa. Under their circumscription, Ammocharis is placed within subtribe Crininae, which has three genera. But, depending on the status of Cybistetes, two to three genera may be considered. If Cybistetes is considered separately as Cybistetes longifolia (L.) Milne-Redh. & Schweick. it is placed in a sister group relationship to Ammocharis within the subtribe, and with Crinum placed as sister to Cybistetes+Ammocharis. Snijman and Kolberg also place this species within Ammocharis, and provide a key to the genus.(2011)

=== Subdivision ===
The World Checklist of Selected Plant Families (WCLSPF) list seven species, including Ammocharis longifolia, rather than consider it as the separate monotypic genus, Cybistetes longifolia. The (WCLSPF) places it in Ammocharis, based on Germishuizen and Meyer (2003). This species has also been called Cybistetes herrei (F.M.Leight.) D.Müll.-Doblies & U.Müll.-Doblies or Ammocharis herrei, but if accepted as Ammocharis, then A. longifolia is the preferred name in WCLSPF.

The placement of Ammocharis longifolia (=Cybistetes longifolia) was finally settled following the detailed study of in depth relationships in Crininae by Kwembeya et al. in 2007, and Cybistetes longifolia restored to Ammocharis.

- Ammocharis angolensis (Baker) Milne-Redh. & Schweick. Uganda to Angola
- Ammocharis baumii (Harms) Milne-Redh. & Schweick. Tropical Africa to Namibia
- Ammocharis coranica (Ker Gawl.) Herb. Distributed from Zimbabwe to South Africa. Known as "Karoo Lily".
- Ammocharis deserticola Snijman & Kolberg
- Ammocharis longifolia (L.) Herb. ("Malgas Lily") Southern Namibia and western Cape Province.
- Ammocharis nerinoides (Baker) Lehmiller Namibia
- Ammocharis tinneana (Kotschy & Peyr.) Milne-Redh. & Schweick. Distributed from Sudan to Namibia.

=== Etymology ===
The genus name derives from two Greek words: ἄμμος (ammos) sand, and χάρις (charis) joy, signifying "delight of the sandy plains" (where it is found).

== Bibliography ==
- Herbert, William (1821). "An Appendix: Preliminary Treatise (pp. 1–14) and A Treatise &c. (pp. 15–52)". The Botanical Register. 7. Piccadilly, London: James Ridgway and Sherwood, Neely, and Sons. For references to Ammocharis, see pp. 2ff., 5ff. and 17.
- Roemer, Max Joseph (1845–1847). Familiarum naturalium regni vegetabilis synopses monographicae; seu, Enumeratio omnium plantarum hucusque detectarum secundum ordines naturales, genera et species digestarum, additis diagnosibus, synonymis, novarumque vel minus cognitarum descriptionibus (4 fascicles). Weimar: Landes-Industrie-Comptoir.
- Germishuizen, G.; Meyer, N.L., eds. (2003). "Plants of Southern Africa: an annotated checklist" (PDF). Strelitzia. 14 (i–vi): 1–1231. Archived from the original (PDF) on 2011-06-27. (online version)
- Müller-Doblies, U.; Müller-Doblies, D. (1996). "Tribes and subtribes and some species combinations in Amaryllidaceae J St Hil R Dahlgren & al. 1985". Feddes Repertorium. 107 (5–6): S.c.1–S.c.9.
- Meerow, Alan W.; Snijman, Deirdre A. (December 2001). "Phylogeny of Amaryllidaceae Tribe Amaryllideae Based on nrDNA ITS Sequences and Morphology". American Journal of Botany. 88 (12): 2321–2330. doi:10.2307/3558392. JSTOR 3558392. PMID 21669663. Archived from the original on 2019-02-26.
- Meerow, Alan W.; Lehmiller, David J.; Clayton, Jason R. (March 2003). "Phylogeny and biogeography of Crinum L. (Amaryllidaceae) inferred from nuclear and limited plastid non-coding DNA sequences". Botanical Journal of the Linnean Society. 141 (3): 349–363. doi:10.1046/j.1095-8339.2003.00142.x. Archived from the original on March 5, 2016.
- Kwembeya, Ezekeil G.; Bjorå, Charlotte S.; Stedje, Brita; Nordal, Inger (1 August 2007). "Phylogenetic Relationships in the Genus Crinum (Amaryllidaceae) with Emphasis on Tropical African Species: Evidence from trnL-F and Nuclear ITS DNA Sequence Data". Taxon. 56 (3): 801. doi:10.2307/25065863. JSTOR 25065863.
- Milne-Redhead, E.; Schweickerdt, H. G. (October 1939). "A new conception of the genus Ammocharis Herb". Journal of the Linnean Society of London, Botany. 52 (342): 159–197. doi:10.1111/j.1095-8339.1939.tb01601.x.
- Lehmiller, David J. (1992). "Transfer of Crinum nerinoides to Ammocharis (Amaryllidaceae)". Novon. 2 (1): 33–35. doi:10.2307/3391605. JSTOR 3391605.
- Snijman, D. A.; Williamson, G. (15 December 1994). "A taxonomic re-assessment of Ammocharis herrei and Cybistetes longifolia (Amaryllideae: Amaryllidaceae)". Bothalia. 24 (2): 127–132. doi:10.4102/abc.v24i2.762.
- Snijman, D. A.; Kolberg, H. (2011). "Ammocharis deserticola (Amaryllideae), a new species from Namibia and a key to species of the genus" (PDF). Bothalia. 41 (2): 308–311. doi:10.4102/abc.v41i2.69. Archived from the original (PDF) on 2017-01-02.
- "World Checklist of Selected Plant Families". Royal Botanic Gardens, Kew.
