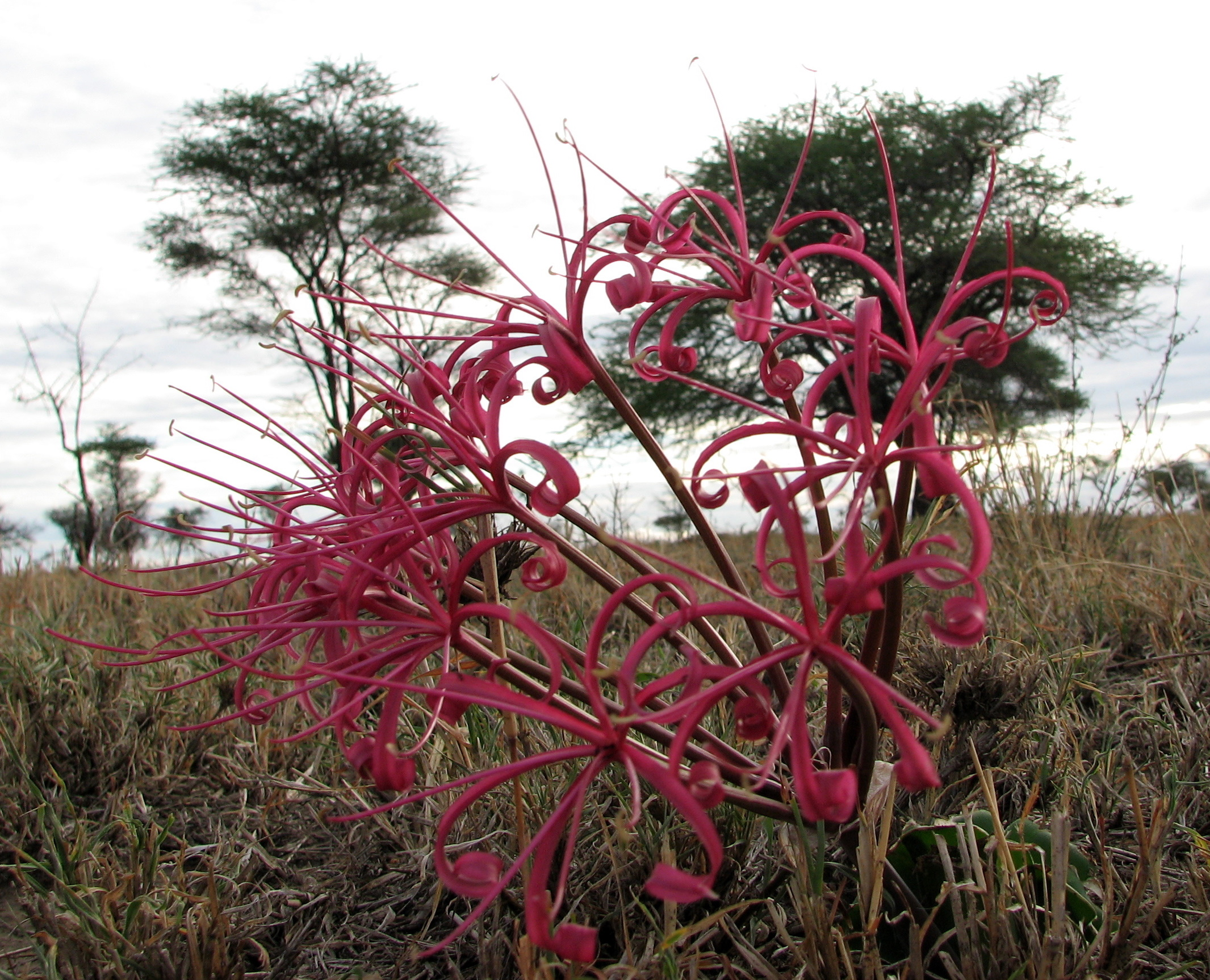

Scientific classification
- Kingdom: Plantae
- Clade: Embryophytes
- Clade: Tracheophytes
- Clade: Angiosperms
- Clade: Monocots
- Order: Asparagales
- Family: Amaryllidaceae
- Subfamily: Amaryllidoideae
- Genus: Ammocharis
- Species: A. tinneana

Binomial name
- Ammocharis tinneana (Kotschy & Peyr.) Milne-Redh. & Schweick.

Synonyms
- Crinum ammocharoides Baker; Crinum bainesii Baker; Crinum cordofanum Kotschy & Peyr.; Crinum lastii Baker; Crinum ondongense Baker; Crinum poggei Pax; Crinum rhodanthum Baker; Crinum thruppii Baker ex Oliv.; Crinum tinneae Kotschy & Peyr.; Crinum tinneanum Kotschy & Peyr.; Stenolirion elliotii Baker

= Ammocharis tinneana =

Species of flowering plant

Ammocharis tinneana, commonly known as the northern ammocharis, is a flowering plant and geophyte belonging to the family Amaryllidaceae and is native to Angola, Botswana, Burundi, Democratic Republic of the Congo, Ethiopia, Kenya, Malawi, Mozambique, Namibia, Rwanda, Central African Republic, Somalia, Sudan, Tanzania, Chad, Uganda, Zambia and Zimbabwe.
