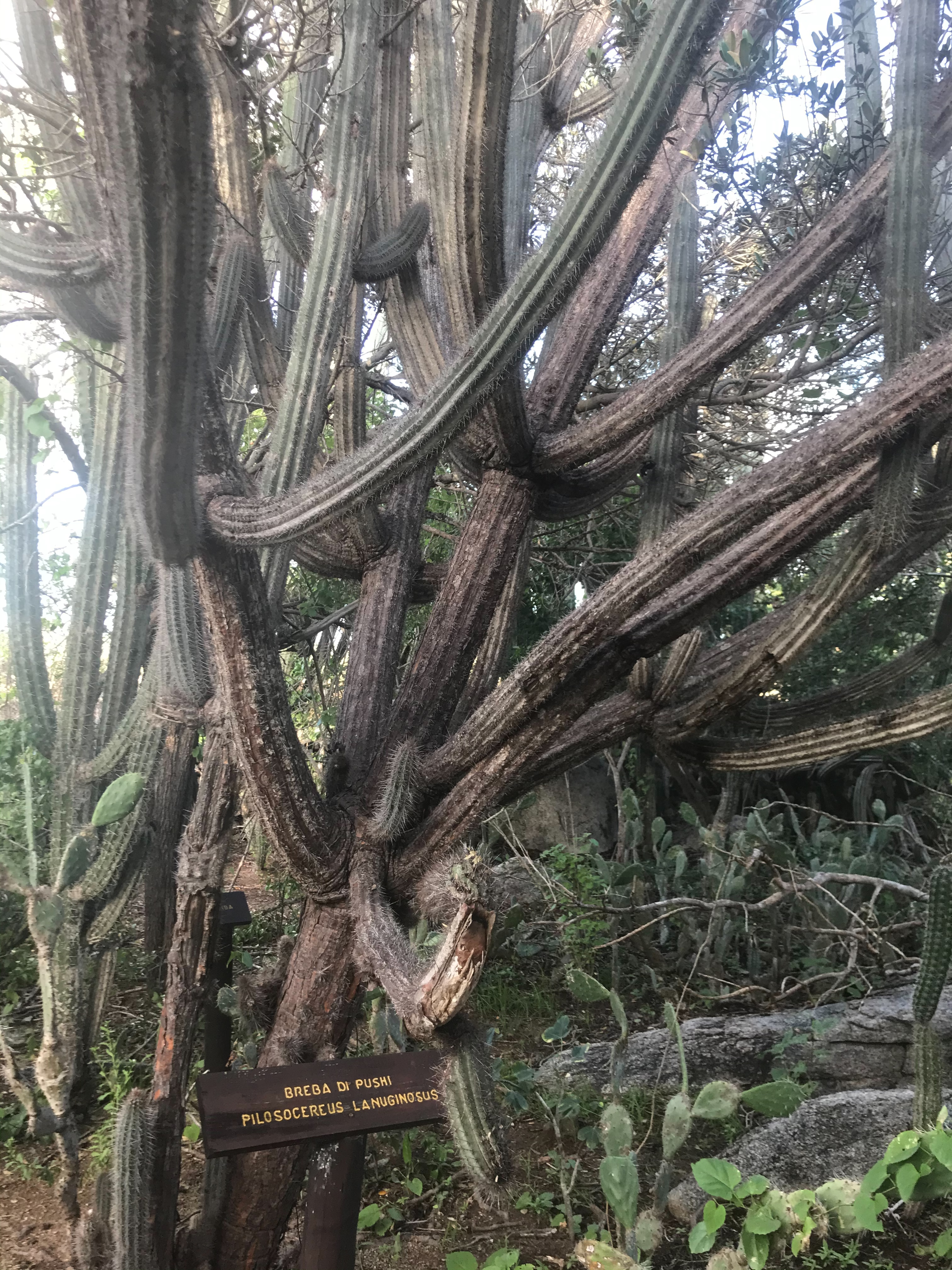
- In Arikok National Park, Aruba

Scientific classification
- Kingdom: Plantae
- Clade: Embryophytes
- Clade: Tracheophytes
- Clade: Spermatophytes
- Clade: Angiosperms
- Clade: Eudicots
- Order: Caryophyllales
- Family: Cactaceae
- Subfamily: Cactoideae
- Genus: Pilosocereus
- Species: P. lanuginosus

Binomial name
- Pilosocereus lanuginosus (L.) Byles & G.D.Rowley

Synonyms
- List: Cactus lanuginosus var. aureus Colla; Cactus lanuginosus L.; Cephalocereus lanuginosus (L.) Britton & Rose; Cereus lanuginosus var. aureus Pfeiff.; Cereus lanuginosus var. glaucescens Pfeiff.; Cereus lanuginosus (L.) Haw., nom. illeg.; Cereus royenii Haw., nom. illeg.; Pilocereus backebergii Weing.; Pilocereus colombianus Backeb.; Pilocereus consolei Lem.; Pilocereus lanuginosus var. virens Rümpler; Pilocereus lanuginosus (L.) Rümpler; Pilocereus swartzii K.Schum.; Pilosocereus panchesiorum Xhonneux

= Pilosocereus lanuginosus =

Species of cactus

Pilosocereus lanuginosus is a species of flowering plant in the cactus family Cactaceae, native to Venezuela, Aruba, Bonaire, and Curaçao in the Leeward Islands. It was first described by Carl Linnaeus in 1753 as Cactus lanuginosus.

== Description ==
Pilosocereus lanuginosus has bluish to greenish stems that are strongly glaucous and have 9–13 ribs. Its branches are usually ascending, sometimes completely upright. The areoles have rigid spines up to 3 cm (1.2 in) long that are golden yellow when young. They often spread and overlap. Flowering areoles have silky hairs up to 3 cm (1.2 in) long in dense tufts. Non-flowering areoles have few hairs. The flowers are 5–7 cm (2.0–2.8 in) long, with glaucous green outer segments (tepals) and white inner segments. The fruit is red.

== Taxonomy ==
The name Cactus lanuginosus was first published by Carl Linnaeus in 1753, accompanied by a short description. Linnaeus referred to a description and illustration in Hermann's Paradisus batavus of 1698. The illustration was designated as the lectotype in 1994. The origin of the illustrated plant was given as Curaçao. The epithet lanuginosus refers to the tufts of silky hairs. The species was later transferred to Cereus and Pilocereus (an illegitimate synonym of Cephalocereus) before being placed in Pilosocereus in 1957.

Some species accepted as of June 2025, including P. colombianus, P. moritzianus, and P. tillianus, have been treated as synonyms of P. lanuginosus. They can be distinguished by various morphological features.

== Distribution ==
Pilosocereus lanuginosus is native to Aruba, Bonaire, and Curaçao in the Leeward Islands. Bonaire and Curaçao together are treated as the Netherlands Antilles in the World Geographical Scheme for Recording Plant Distributions.
