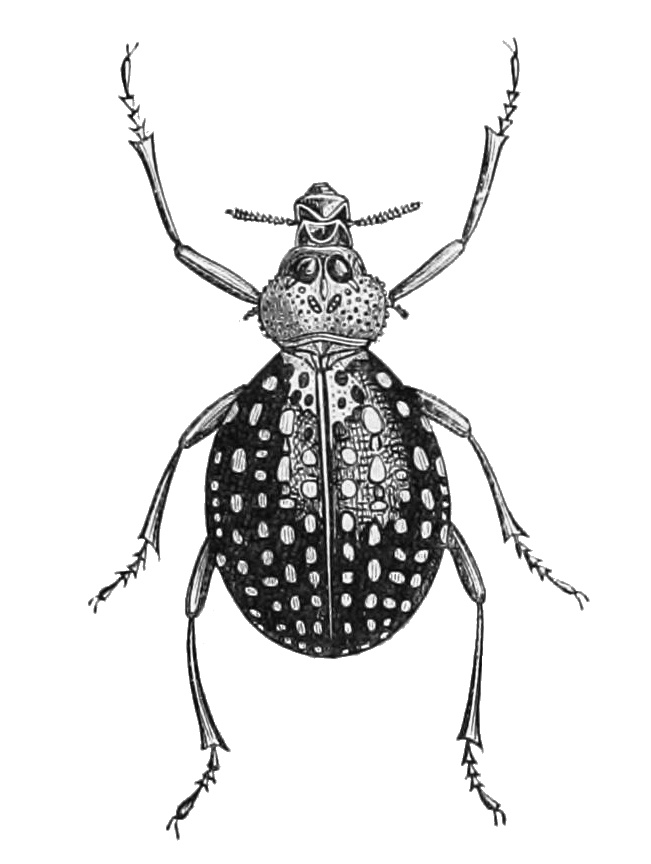

Scientific classification
- Kingdom: Animalia
- Phylum: Arthropoda
- Class: Insecta
- Order: Coleoptera
- Suborder: Polyphaga
- Infraorder: Cucujiformia
- Family: Brachyceridae
- Genus: Brachycerus
- Species: B. sacer

Binomial name
- Brachycerus sacer (Latreille, 1827)

= Brachycerus sacer =

Species of beetle

Brachycerus sacer is a species of family Curculionidae, subfamily Brachycerinae. It was described by Pierre André Latreille in 1827.
