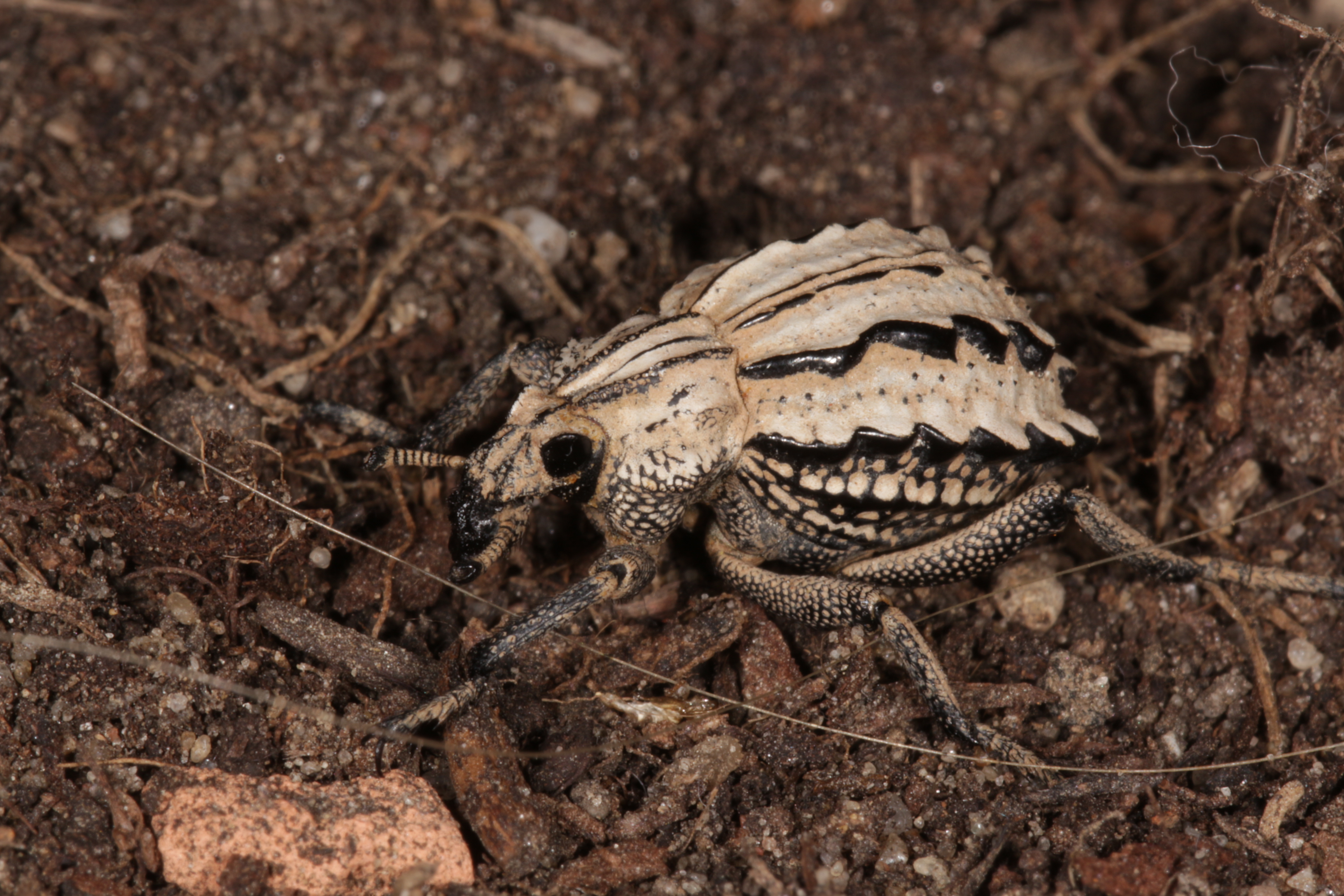
- Brachycerus albidentatus from Europe

Scientific classification
- Kingdom: Animalia
- Phylum: Arthropoda
- Clade: Pancrustacea
- Class: Insecta
- Order: Coleoptera
- Suborder: Polyphaga
- Infraorder: Cucujiformia
- Superfamily: Curculionoidea
- Family: Brachyceridae
- Tribe: Brachycerini
- Genus: Brachycerus; Olivier, 1789

= Brachycerus =

Genus of beetles

Brachycerus is a genus of weevils in the family Curculionidae and the subfamily Brachycerinae.

== Species ==
According to Catalogue of Life (August 30, 2014):

- Brachycerus abbreviatus
- Brachycerus accola
- Brachycerus acerbus
- Brachycerus adustus
- Brachycerus advenus
- Brachycerus aegrotus
- Brachycerus aegyptiacus
- Brachycerus affaber
- Brachycerus affixus
- Brachycerus albarius
- Brachycerus albicollis
- Brachycerus albidentatus Gyllenhal, 1840
- Brachycerus albofasciatus
- Brachycerus albotectus
- Brachycerus algirus
- Brachycerus alpinus
- Brachycerus amabilis
- Brachycerus amatongas
- Brachycerus ambulans
- Brachycerus amplexicollis
- Brachycerus anaglypticus
- Brachycerus angusticollis
- Brachycerus angustus
- Brachycerus annulatus
- Brachycerus apicatus
- Brachycerus approximans
- Brachycerus apterus
- Brachycerus arcanus
- Brachycerus areolatus
- Brachycerus argillaceus Reiche, 1857
- Brachycerus aridus
- Brachycerus armatus
- Brachycerus asper
- Brachycerus atlasicus
- Brachycerus atrox
- Brachycerus attenuatus
- Brachycerus auguris
- Brachycerus auritus
- Brachycerus australis
- Brachycerus axillaris
- Brachycerus baccatus
- Brachycerus balearicus Bedel, 1874
- Brachycerus barbarus Linnaeus, 1767
- Brachycerus bardus
- Brachycerus batrachus
- Brachycerus benignus
- Brachycerus besseri
- Brachycerus bicallosus
- Brachycerus bicornutus
- Brachycerus biglobatus
- Brachycerus bimaculatus
- Brachycerus boei
- Brachycerus boschimanus
- Brachycerus bottegi
- Brachycerus brachyceropsides
- Brachycerus brevicostatus
- Brachycerus brittoni
- Brachycerus buculus
- Brachycerus bufo Germar
- Brachycerus bullatus
- Brachycerus caffer
- Brachycerus callosus Gyllenhal, 1833
- Brachycerus canalicollis
- Brachycerus canalirostris
- Brachycerus cancellatus
- Brachycerus capensis
- Brachycerus caperans
- Brachycerus capitalis
- Brachycerus capito
- Brachycerus carbunculus
- Brachycerus carinula
- Brachycerus catenulatus
- Brachycerus caviceps
- Brachycerus cavifrons
- Brachycerus ceratus
- Brachycerus certus
- Brachycerus cervatus
- Brachycerus chevrolati
- Brachycerus cicatriculatus
- Brachycerus cincticollis
- Brachycerus cinctipes
- Brachycerus cinerarius
- Brachycerus cinereus
- Brachycerus cinnamomeus
- Brachycerus cirriferus
- Brachycerus cirrosus
- Brachycerus clathratus
- Brachycerus clitellatus
- Brachycerus coecus
- Brachycerus colasi
- Brachycerus collaris
- Brachycerus comatus
- Brachycerus comparabilis
- Brachycerus comtus
- Brachycerus concii
- Brachycerus condignus
- Brachycerus confragosus
- Brachycerus confusus
- Brachycerus congestus
- Brachycerus consimilis
- Brachycerus contextus
- Brachycerus contortus
- Brachycerus contractus
- Brachycerus controversus
- Brachycerus cordiger
- Brachycerus corniculatus
- Brachycerus cornifrons
- Brachycerus cornutus
- Brachycerus coronirostris
- Brachycerus corrosus
- Brachycerus costalis
- Brachycerus costatus
- Brachycerus crenatus
- Brachycerus cribrarius
- Brachycerus crispatirostris
- Brachycerus crispatus
- Brachycerus crispicularis
- Brachycerus cristatus
- Brachycerus curruca
- Brachycerus curtulus
- Brachycerus cylindripes
- Brachycerus damarensis
- Brachycerus deceptor
- Brachycerus densegranosus
- Brachycerus desertus
- Brachycerus detritus
- Brachycerus difficilis
- Brachycerus difformis
- Brachycerus discolor
- Brachycerus disjunctus
- Brachycerus dispar
- Brachycerus divergens
- Brachycerus dollmani
- Brachycerus dolosus
- Brachycerus dorsalis
- Brachycerus dorsomaculatus
- Brachycerus draco
- Brachycerus dregei
- Brachycerus dubius
- Brachycerus dumosus
- Brachycerus duplicatus
- Brachycerus ebullinus
- Brachycerus echinatus
- Brachycerus eckloni
- Brachycerus effertus
- Brachycerus egenus
- Brachycerus electilis
- Brachycerus elgonensis
- Brachycerus emeritus
- Brachycerus eminulus
- Brachycerus ephippiatus
- Brachycerus erinaceus
- Brachycerus eritius
- Brachycerus erosus
- Brachycerus errans
- Brachycerus estriatus
- Brachycerus europaeus
- Brachycerus europoeus
- Brachycerus excisus
- Brachycerus excursus
- Brachycerus exemptus
- Brachycerus exilis
- Brachycerus eximius
- Brachycerus facietatus
- Brachycerus fahraei
- Brachycerus farctus
- Brachycerus fascicularis
- Brachycerus fasciculosus
- Brachycerus fausti
- Brachycerus favillaceus
- Brachycerus ferox
- Brachycerus ferrugatus
- Brachycerus ferrugineus
- Brachycerus fimbriatus
- Brachycerus fischeri
- Brachycerus flavonotatus
- Brachycerus fluctiger
- Brachycerus formidulosus
- Brachycerus fortunatus
- Brachycerus fossulatus
- Brachycerus foveicollis Gyllenhal, 1833
- Brachycerus foveifrons
- Brachycerus foveolatus
- Brachycerus frigidus
- Brachycerus frontalis
- Brachycerus fuliginosus
- Brachycerus fumigatus
- Brachycerus furcatus
- Brachycerus gandanus
- Brachycerus gemmatus
- Brachycerus gemmeus
- Brachycerus gemmiferus
- Brachycerus gemmosus
- Brachycerus germanus
- Brachycerus gibbosus
- Brachycerus glabratus
- Brachycerus glanduliferus
- Brachycerus glandulosus
- Brachycerus globiferus
- Brachycerus globosus
- Brachycerus graecus Zumpt, 1937
- Brachycerus granicollis
- Brachycerus granifer
- Brachycerus granirostris
- Brachycerus granosus
- Brachycerus granulatus
- Brachycerus gratulus
- Brachycerus gravis
- Brachycerus griseus
- Brachycerus gryphus
- Brachycerus guineensis
- Brachycerus gyllenhali
- Brachycerus haedus
- Brachycerus hartli
- Brachycerus herteli
- Brachycerus hessei
- Brachycerus hilaris
- Brachycerus hispanicus
- Brachycerus hispidus
- Brachycerus hofmanni
- Brachycerus honorabilis
- Brachycerus hosticus
- Brachycerus hottentottus
- Brachycerus humeralis
- Brachycerus hybridus
- Brachycerus hydropicus
- Brachycerus hypocritus
- Brachycerus hystrix
- Brachycerus ignavus
- Brachycerus imitator
- Brachycerus impendens
- Brachycerus impius
- Brachycerus impressicollis
- Brachycerus impressifrons
- Brachycerus imprudens
- Brachycerus inaequalis
- Brachycerus incanus
- Brachycerus incertus
- Brachycerus incommodus
- Brachycerus incultus
- Brachycerus inderiensis
- Brachycerus indutus
- Brachycerus infacetus
- Brachycerus infitialis
- Brachycerus ingratus
- Brachycerus inops
- Brachycerus inordinatus
- Brachycerus inquinatus
- Brachycerus insignis
- Brachycerus insperatus
- Brachycerus instabilis
- Brachycerus insularis
- Brachycerus intermedius
- Brachycerus interpositus
- Brachycerus interpunctatus
- Brachycerus interruptus
- Brachycerus interstitialis
- Brachycerus intutus
- Brachycerus inurbanus
- Brachycerus ixodicoides
- Brachycerus jucundus
- Brachycerus junix Lichtenstein, 1796
- Brachycerus juvencus
- Brachycerus kabylianus
- Brachycerus karooensis
- Brachycerus kaszabi
- Brachycerus khoikhoianus
- Brachycerus kochi
- Brachycerus koebergensis
- Brachycerus koroquanus
- Brachycerus kumbanensis
- Brachycerus labeculatus
- Brachycerus labrusca
- Brachycerus lacordairei
- Brachycerus laevifrons
- Brachycerus lafertei
- Brachycerus lascivus
- Brachycerus lateralis
- Brachycerus lateritius
- Brachycerus latifrons
- Brachycerus latro
- Brachycerus laufferi
- Brachycerus lentus
- Brachycerus lepineyi
- Brachycerus leprosus
- Brachycerus levidipus
- Brachycerus libertinus
- Brachycerus limbatus
- Brachycerus lineata
- Brachycerus lineatus
- Brachycerus lituratus
- Brachycerus lividicollis
- Brachycerus lobaticollis
- Brachycerus loculosus
- Brachycerus lomii
- Brachycerus longirostris
- Brachycerus longiusculus
- Brachycerus longulus
- Brachycerus loquax
- Brachycerus luridus
- Brachycerus lusitanicus
- Brachycerus luteus
- Brachycerus lutosus Gyllenhal, 1833
- Brachycerus lutulentus
- Brachycerus lyrae
- Brachycerus maculatus
- Brachycerus maculicollis
- Brachycerus maculipes
- Brachycerus maculosus
- Brachycerus madagascariensis
- Brachycerus madecassus
- Brachycerus magnificus
- Brachycerus malaisei
- Brachycerus mamillatus
- Brachycerus manifestus
- Brachycerus margaritaceus
- Brachycerus margaritifer
- Brachycerus marshalli
- Brachycerus mauritanicus
- Brachycerus meracus
- Brachycerus microps
- Brachycerus millepora
- Brachycerus milleporellus
- Brachycerus mingottii
- Brachycerus modestus
- Brachycerus modicus
- Brachycerus moerens
- Brachycerus moestus
- Brachycerus molestus
- Brachycerus mollis
- Brachycerus monachus
- Brachycerus morio
- Brachycerus morosus
- Brachycerus mouffleti
- Brachycerus muricatus Olivier, 1790
- Brachycerus murinus
- Brachycerus namanus
- Brachycerus namaqua
- Brachycerus nanus
- Brachycerus natalensis
- Brachycerus nebulosus
- Brachycerus nervosus
- Brachycerus nodiferus
- Brachycerus nodifrons
- Brachycerus nodipennis
- Brachycerus nodulosus
- Brachycerus normandi
- Brachycerus nubilus
- Brachycerus nudus
- Brachycerus nychthemerus
- Brachycerus obesus
- Brachycerus oblongus
- Brachycerus obtusa
- Brachycerus obtusus
- Brachycerus ocellatus
- Brachycerus ochreatus
- Brachycerus ochreosignatus
- Brachycerus oculatus
- Brachycerus olivieri
- Brachycerus omissa
- Brachycerus oniscus
- Brachycerus opacus
- Brachycerus opatrinus
- Brachycerus orbipennis
- Brachycerus ornatus Westwood, 1837
- Brachycerus ostentatus
- Brachycerus ovatus
- Brachycerus oxonchus
- Brachycerus pachydermus
- Brachycerus papei
- Brachycerus papillosus
- Brachycerus papulosus
- Brachycerus paradoxus
- Brachycerus parcus
- Brachycerus parens
- Brachycerus parilis
- Brachycerus peninsularis
- Brachycerus peregrinus
- Brachycerus perfossus
- Brachycerus perodiosus
- Brachycerus perplexus
- Brachycerus perrieri
- Brachycerus pertusus
- Brachycerus perversus
- Brachycerus petulcus
- Brachycerus phlyctaenoides
- Brachycerus phrygianus
- Brachycerus phrynopterus
- Brachycerus picturatus
- Brachycerus pictus
- Brachycerus piger
- Brachycerus pilifer
- Brachycerus pimelioides
- Brachycerus pisiferus
- Brachycerus planirostris
- Brachycerus planus
- Brachycerus plicatus Gyllenhal, 1833
- Brachycerus pollinosus
- Brachycerus polymastulus
- Brachycerus polyophthalmus
- Brachycerus porcellus
- Brachycerus poricollis
- Brachycerus posticus
- Brachycerus pradieri Fairmaire, 1856
- Brachycerus praecursor
- Brachycerus praemorsus
- Brachycerus probus
- Brachycerus prodigus
- Brachycerus productus
- Brachycerus prolatus
- Brachycerus proletarius
- Brachycerus prolixus
- Brachycerus pseudocancellatus
- Brachycerus pseudoscutellatus
- Brachycerus pterygomalis
- Brachycerus puerilis
- Brachycerus pullatus
- Brachycerus pulverulentus
- Brachycerus pulverus
- Brachycerus pumilus
- Brachycerus punctulatus
- Brachycerus punicanus
- Brachycerus pusillus
- Brachycerus pusio
- Brachycerus pustulatus
- Brachycerus pustulosus
- Brachycerus pygmaeus
- Brachycerus quadrata
- Brachycerus quadratus
- Brachycerus quadrisulcatus
- Brachycerus racemus
- Brachycerus raffrayi
- Brachycerus ramosus
- Brachycerus rectecostatus
- Brachycerus rectinasus
- Brachycerus recurvus
- Brachycerus reflexus
- Brachycerus regius
- Brachycerus regularis
- Brachycerus reinhardti
- Brachycerus repertus Roudier, 1958
- Brachycerus reticulatus
- Brachycerus reticulosus
- Brachycerus retusa
- Brachycerus retusus
- Brachycerus rhodesianus
- Brachycerus rigidus
- Brachycerus riguus
- Brachycerus rikatlensis
- Brachycerus rixator
- Brachycerus rostratus
- Brachycerus rothschildi
- Brachycerus rotundatus
- Brachycerus rotundicollis Escalera, 1918
- Brachycerus rubiginosus
- Brachycerus rudis
- Brachycerus rudolphi
- Brachycerus rufipes Zumpt, 1937
- Brachycerus rufoverrucosus
- Brachycerus rugipes
- Brachycerus rugosus
- Brachycerus rugulosus
- Brachycerus rusticanus
- Brachycerus sacer
- Brachycerus saevus
- Brachycerus saginatus
- Brachycerus salamensis
- Brachycerus sardeus
- Brachycerus saxosus
- Brachycerus scaber
- Brachycerus scabiosus
- Brachycerus scabrosus
- Brachycerus scalaris
- Brachycerus scelestus
- Brachycerus schalowi
- Brachycerus schatzmayri Zumpt, 1937
- Brachycerus schoenherri
- Brachycerus scoposus
- Brachycerus scrobicollis
- Brachycerus scrobiculatus
- Brachycerus scrobipennis
- Brachycerus scrobirostris
- Brachycerus scrupulosus
- Brachycerus sculpticollis
- Brachycerus sculpturatus
- Brachycerus scutellaris
- Brachycerus scutipennis
- Brachycerus scutirostris
- Brachycerus sefrensis
- Brachycerus semiaeneus
- Brachycerus semiocellatus
- Brachycerus semituberculatus
- Brachycerus sericeus
- Brachycerus seriedentatus
- Brachycerus serratus
- Brachycerus setiger
- Brachycerus setipennis
- Brachycerus setosus
- Brachycerus severus
- Brachycerus sibericus
- Brachycerus siculus
- Brachycerus sideratus
- Brachycerus signatus
- Brachycerus similis
- Brachycerus sinuatus Olivier, 1807
- Brachycerus socors
- Brachycerus sparrmani
- Brachycerus sparsipes
- Brachycerus speciosus
- Brachycerus spectrum
- Brachycerus spilopterus
- Brachycerus spinicollis
- Brachycerus spinifex
- Brachycerus spiniger
- Brachycerus spinipes
- Brachycerus spinirostris
- Brachycerus spissus
- Brachycerus spurcus
- Brachycerus squalidus
- Brachycerus squamosus
- Brachycerus stellaris
- Brachycerus stellatus
- Brachycerus stenoderus
- Brachycerus sterilis
- Brachycerus sticticus
- Brachycerus strumosus
- Brachycerus stygius
- Brachycerus subfasciatus
- Brachycerus sublaevis
- Brachycerus subvariolatus
- Brachycerus subverrucosus
- Brachycerus sulcaticeps
- Brachycerus sulcicollis
- Brachycerus sulcifrons
- Brachycerus sulphuratus
- Brachycerus superciliosus
- Brachycerus suspiciosus
- Brachycerus suturalis
- Brachycerus taeniatus
- Brachycerus tauricus
- Brachycerus tectus
- Brachycerus tenebrosus
- Brachycerus tergosignatus
- Brachycerus tessellatus
- Brachycerus tetanicus
- Brachycerus tetragona
- Brachycerus tetragonus
- Brachycerus texatus
- Brachycerus thunbergii
- Brachycerus tigripes
- Brachycerus torosus
- Brachycerus torridus
- Brachycerus torvus
- Brachycerus transversefoveatus
- Brachycerus transversus
- Brachycerus tremens
- Brachycerus trepidus
- Brachycerus trifoveatus
- Brachycerus tropicalis
- Brachycerus tuberculatus
- Brachycerus tuberculosus
- Brachycerus tuberosus
- Brachycerus turbatus
- Brachycerus turgidus
- Brachycerus turriferus
- Brachycerus tursio
- Brachycerus tutus
- Brachycerus ulcerosus
- Brachycerus umbrinus
- Brachycerus undatus Fabricius, 1798
- Brachycerus ungulatus
- Brachycerus urens
- Brachycerus uva
- Brachycerus uvula
- Brachycerus vacca
- Brachycerus vagabundus
- Brachycerus valentulus
- Brachycerus validus
- Brachycerus variegatus
- Brachycerus variipictus
- Brachycerus variolosus
- Brachycerus varius
- Brachycerus velutinus
- Brachycerus ventralis
- Brachycerus venustus
- Brachycerus verecundus
- Brachycerus vermiculatus
- Brachycerus verrucifer
- Brachycerus verrucipennis
- Brachycerus verrucosiusculus
- Brachycerus verrucosus
- Brachycerus verruculatus
- Brachycerus verruculosus
- Brachycerus versicolor
- Brachycerus vespertilio
- Brachycerus vestitus
- Brachycerus vexator
- Brachycerus viduatus
- Brachycerus vigilans
- Brachycerus virgatus
- Brachycerus vitiosus
- Brachycerus vulsus
- Brachycerus wahlbergi
- Brachycerus westermanni
- Brachycerus zeyheri
