= Ammocharis angolensis =

Scientific classification
- Kingdom: Plantae
- Clade: Embryophytes
- Clade: Tracheophytes
- Clade: Angiosperms
- Clade: Monocots
- Order: Asparagales
- Family: Amaryllidaceae
- Subfamily: Amaryllidoideae
- Genus: Ammocharis
- Species: A. angolensis

Binomial name
- Ammocharis angolensis (Baker) Milne-Redh. & Schweick.

Synonyms
- Ammocharis heterostyla (Bullock) Milne-Redh. & Schweick.; Boophone angolensis Baker; Crinum angolense (Baker) Benth. ex Baker; Crinum curvifolium Baker; Crinum heterostylum Bullock

Species of flowering plant

Ammocharis angolensis is a flowering plant and geophyte belonging to the family Amaryllidaceae and is native to Angola, Democratic Republic of the Congo, Kenya, Tanzania, Uganda and Zambia.
