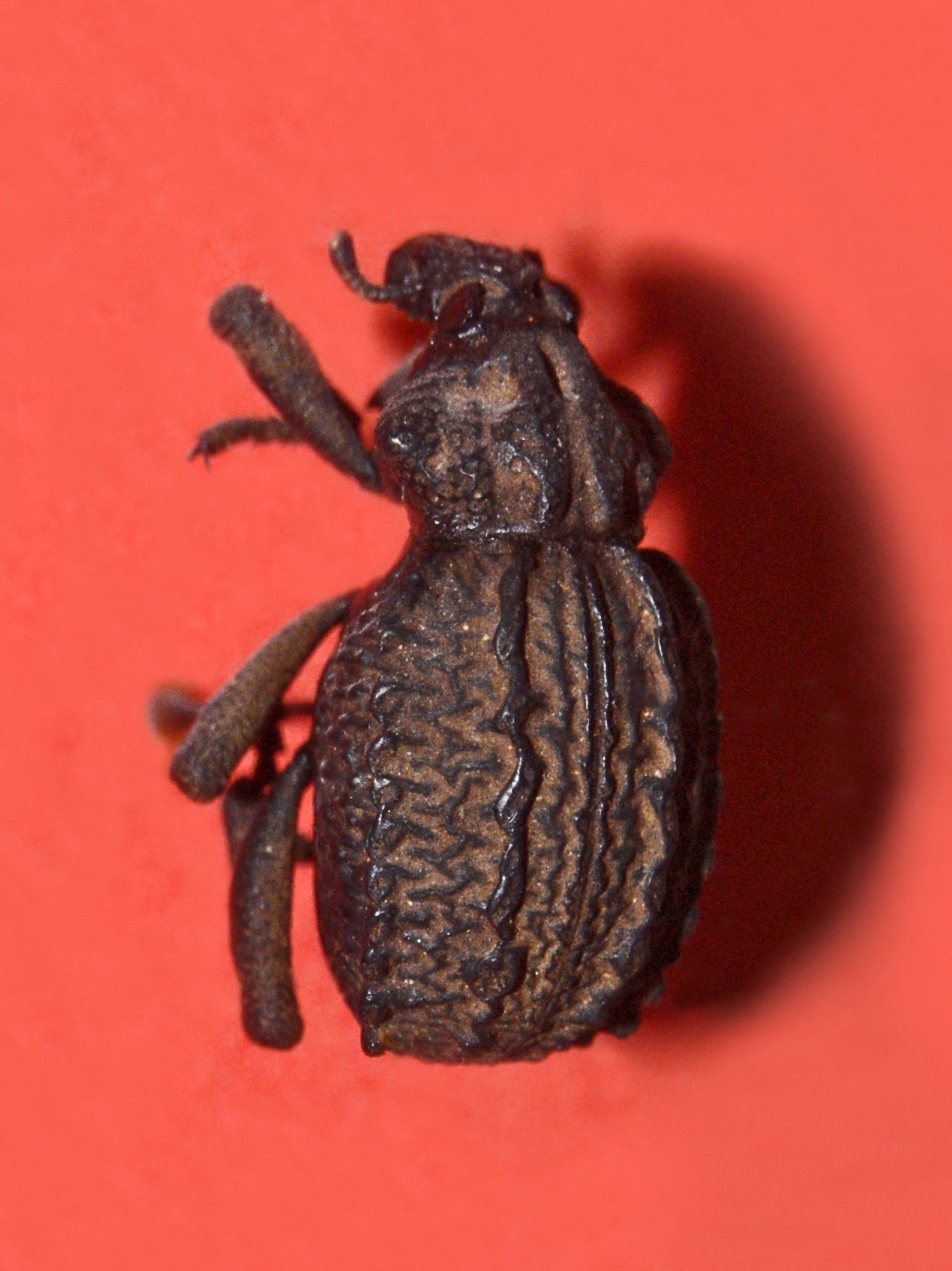
- Museum specimen of Brachycerus barbarus

Scientific classification
- Kingdom: Animalia
- Phylum: Arthropoda
- Class: Insecta
- Order: Coleoptera
- Suborder: Polyphaga
- Infraorder: Cucujiformia
- Family: Brachyceridae
- Genus: Brachycerus
- Species: B. barbarus

Binomial name
- Brachycerus barbarus (Linnaeus, 1767)

Synonyms
- Rynchaenus barbarus Linnaeus, 1767

= Brachycerus barbarus =

Species of beetle

Brachycerus barbarus is a species of family Curculionidae, subfamily Brachycerinae.

== Description ==
Brachycerus barbarus reaches a length of about 15 millimetres (0.59 in). The pronotum and elytra are black, with strong longitudinal ridges. These weevils feed on the medicinal squill (Drimia maritima).

== Distribution ==
This species occurs in France, Italy, Portugal, Spain and in North Africa.
