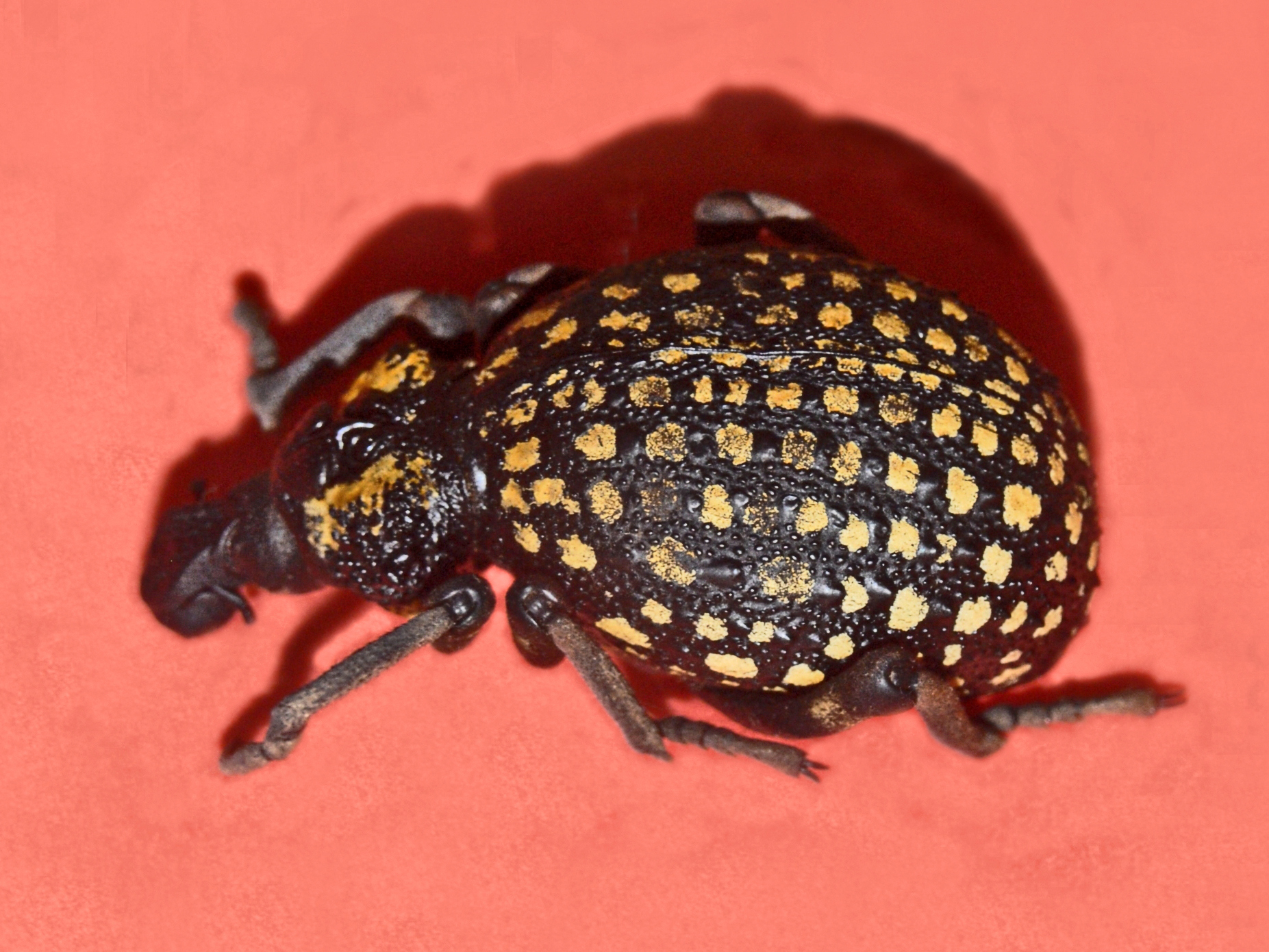
- Museum specimen of Brachycerus bufo

Scientific classification
- Kingdom: Animalia
- Phylum: Arthropoda
- Class: Insecta
- Order: Coleoptera
- Suborder: Polyphaga
- Infraorder: Cucujiformia
- Family: Brachyceridae
- Subfamily: Brachycerinae
- Tribe: Brachycerini; Billberg, 1820

Genera
- See text

= Brachycerini =

Tribe of beetles

Brachycerini is a weevil tribe in the subfamily Brachycerinae.

== Genera ==
- Brachycerus – Euretus – Progradivus – Theates – Theatomorphus
