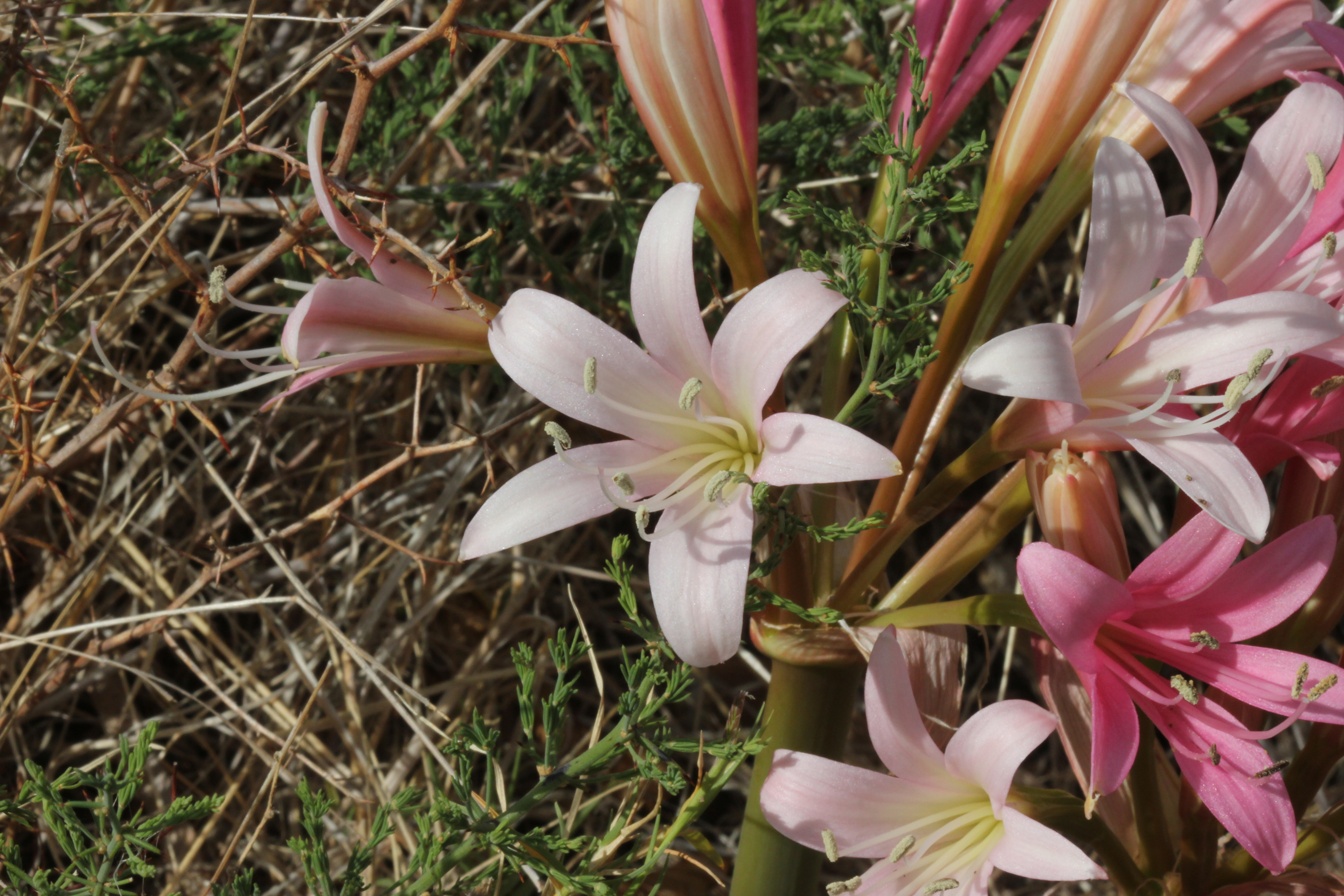

Scientific classification
- Kingdom: Plantae
- Clade: Tracheophytes
- Clade: Angiosperms
- Clade: Monocots
- Order: Asparagales
- Family: Amaryllidaceae
- Subfamily: Amaryllidoideae
- Genus: Ammocharis
- Species: A. longifolia

Binomial name
- Ammocharis longifolia (L.) Herb.

Synonyms
- Cybistetes longifolia (L.) Milne-Redh. & Schweick.; Crinum longifolium (L.) Thunb.; Crinum falcatum Jacq.; Crinum capense (Mill.) Herb.; Brunsvigia falcata (Jacq.) Ker-Gawl.

= Ammocharis longifolia =

Species of flowering plant

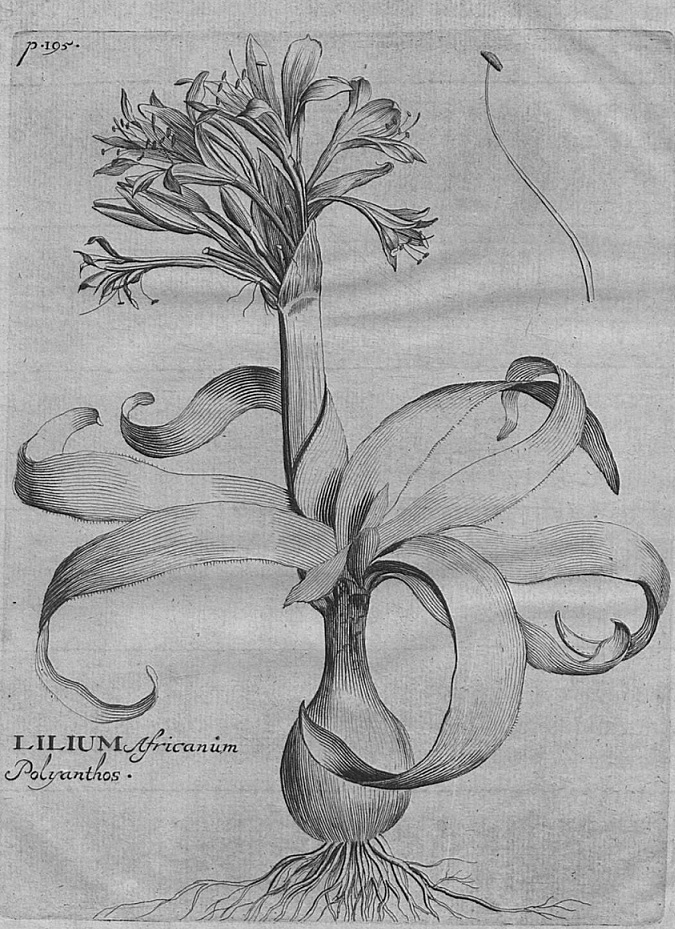
Lilium Africanum Polyanthos in Paradisus batavus, 1698

Ammocharis longifolia is an African species of bulbous flowering plant in the family Amaryllidaceae. It has been placed as the only species, Cybistetes longifolia, in the monotypic genus Cybistetes.

== Description ==
Ammocharis longifolia is a perennial geophyte with large (100–150 mm) bulbs, 9–14 prostrate leaves, a 13–90 flowered inflorescence, flowers funnel-shaped, ivory or pale to dark pink, tepals connate forming a floral tube.

It is distinguished from other species of Ammocharis by the presence of zygomorphic flowers, as opposed to actinomorphic, and by its seed dispersal mechanism, with a wind blown indehiscent infructescence (fruiting head) that gave it its name. The fruiting head dries rapidly and is shed as a single unit, which the rolls away (tumbles), born by the wind. Another distinguishing feature in the infructescence is the pedicels, which elongate, spread apart, stiffen and ultimately radiate equally in all directions.

== Taxonomy ==
=== History ===
The taxon was originally described by Linnaeus in 1753 as Amaryllis longifolia, one of eight species in that genus, but was well known and cultivated in Europe long before that, Linnaeus basing his description on Paul Hermann's Paradisus Batavus (1698) as Lilium Africanum Polyanthos. Since then it has had a complicated history as detailed by Milne-Redhead and Schweickerdt, being variously placed in Crinum and Brunsvigia.

Cybistetes was one of three genera in subtribe Crininae and Cybistetes longifolia has been considered a synonym for Ammocharis longifolia in the closely related genus Ammocharis since 2007, and is treated as such by the World Checklist of Selected Plant Families. Prior to that it was treated as a separate genus by taxonomists in a Sister) relationship to Ammocharis. In that configuration the third genus of subtribe Crininae, Crinum was then in a sister relationship to the Cybistetes+Ammocharis clade.

Cybistetes was described by Milne-Redhead and Schweickerdt in 1939, and fairly consistently treated as a separate genus, being distinct from Ammocharis in both distribution and seed dispersal, and was grouped within Crininae by recircumscription of this subtribe in 2001, based on molecular phylogenetics. Milne-Redhead and Schweickerdt had segregated Cybistetes from Ammocharis largely on the basis of infructescence structure. For Cybistetes the entire infructescence of indehiscent fruits is the dispersal unit (anemogeochory ). By contrast Ammocharis fruits are dehiscent and infrutescence is lax. However Snijman and Linder (1996) had suggested, on morphological grounds alone that Cybistetes and Ammocharis be embedded in Crinum, there being insufficient synapomorphy to separate them, nevertheless they retained the distinction in their delineation of the subtribe (which incidentally contained Boophone). Although Germishuizen and Meyer embedded Cybistetes in Ammocharis in their original (2003) Plants of Southern Africa, the 2007 online version lists it separately.

Eventually a much more detailed study in 2007 with a greater sampling of Ammocharis showed that Cybistetes is indeed embedded in Ammocharis as A. longifolia, where it is sister to A. angolensis. Snijman and Kolberg (2011) provide a key to the entire genus of Ammocharis, including A. longifolia. There, it is distinguished from A. deserticola by its short perigone tube of only 8–15 mm long, relative to the latter (50–90 mm)

== Distribution ==
It is distributed in southern Namibia and western Cape Province, which constitute the extreme western region of winter rainfall in southern Africa.

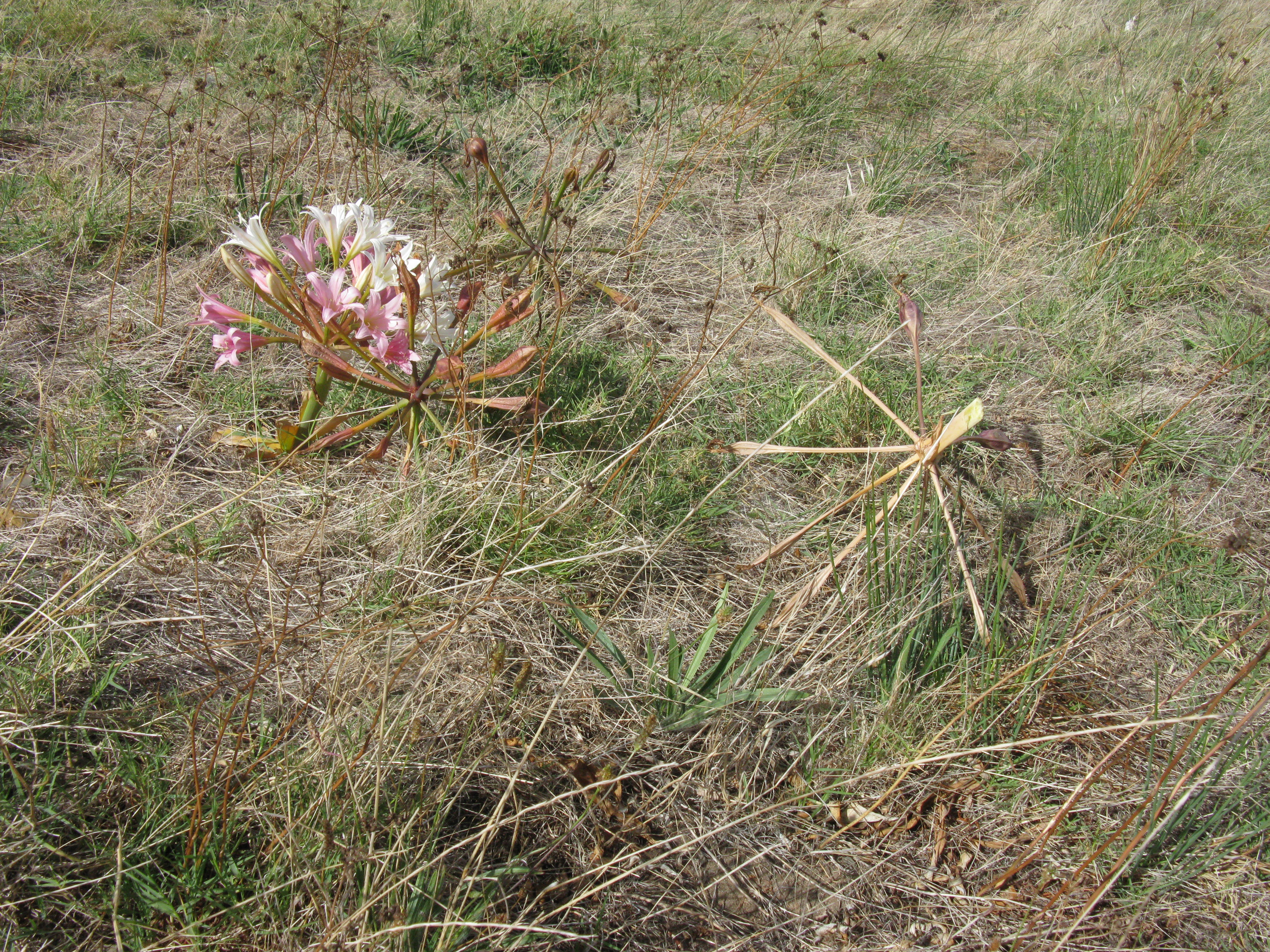
Left to right: Flowering inflorescence, fruiting inflorescence, tumbling infruitescence

== Bibliography ==
- Hermann, Paul (1705) [1698]. Paradisus Batavus, Continens Plus centum Plantas affabre aere incisas & Descriptionibus illustratas; Cui Accessit Catalogus Plantarum, quas pro Tomis nondum editis, delineandas curaverat (2nd ed.). Leiden: Elzevier.
- Linnaeus, C. (1753). Species Plantarum. Stockholm: Laurentii Salvii.
- Meerow, Alan W.; Lehmiller, David J.; Clayton, Jason R. (March 2003). "Phylogeny and biogeography of Crinum L. (Amaryllidaceae) inferred from nuclear and limited plastid non-coding DNA sequences". Botanical Journal of the Linnean Society. 141 (3): 349–363. doi:10.1046/j.1095-8339.2003.00142.x. Archived from the original on March 5, 2016.
- Kwembeya, Ezekeil G.; Bjorå, Charlotte S.; Stedje, Brita; Nordal, Inger (1 August 2007). "Phylogenetic Relationships in the Genus Crinum (Amaryllidaceae) with Emphasis on Tropical African Species: Evidence from trnL-F and Nuclear ITS DNA Sequence Data". Taxon. 56 (3): 801. doi:10.2307/25065863. JSTOR 25065863.
- Germishuizen, G.; Meyer, N.L., eds. (2003). "Plants of Southern Africa: an annotated checklist" (PDF). Strelitzia. 14 (i–vi): 1–1231. Archived from the original (PDF) on 2011-06-27. (online version)
- Milne-Redhead, E.; Schweickerdt, H. G. (October 1939). "A new conception of the genus Ammocharis Herb". Journal of the Linnean Society of London, Botany. 52 (342): 159–197. doi:10.1111/j.1095-8339.1939.tb01601.x.
- Müller-Doblies, U.; Müller-Doblies, D. (1996). "Tribes and subtribes and some species combinations in Amaryllidaceae J St Hil R Dahlgren & al. 1985". Feddes Repertorium. 107 (5–6): S.c.1–S.c.9.
- Meerow, Alan W.; Snijman, Deirdre A. (December 2001). "Phylogeny of Amaryllidaceae Tribe Amaryllideae Based on nrDNA ITS Sequences and Morphology". American Journal of Botany. 88 (12): 2321–2330. doi:10.2307/3558392. JSTOR 3558392. PMID 21669663. Archived from the original on 2019-02-26.
- Snijman, D. A.; Williamson, G. (15 December 1994). "A taxonomic re-assessment of Ammocharis herrei and Cybistetes longifolia (Amaryllideae: Amaryllidaceae)". Bothalia. 24 (2): 127–132. doi:10.4102/abc.v24i2.762.
- Snijman, D. A.; Linder, H. P. (1996). "Phylogenetic Relationships, Seed Characters, and Dispersal System Evolution in Amaryllideae (Amaryllidaceae)". Annals of the Missouri Botanical Garden. 83 (3): 362–386. doi:10.2307/2399866. JSTOR 2399866.
- Snijman, D. A.; Kolberg, H. (2011). "Ammocharis deserticola (Amaryllideae), a new species from Namibia and a key to species of the genus" (PDF). Bothalia. 41 (2): 308–311. doi:10.4102/abc.v41i2.69. Archived from the original (PDF) on 2017-01-02.
- "World Checklist of Selected Plant Families". Royal Botanic Gardens, Kew.
- "Ammocharis longifolia (L.) M. Roem". Conservatoire et Jardin botaniques. SANBI. 2012.
