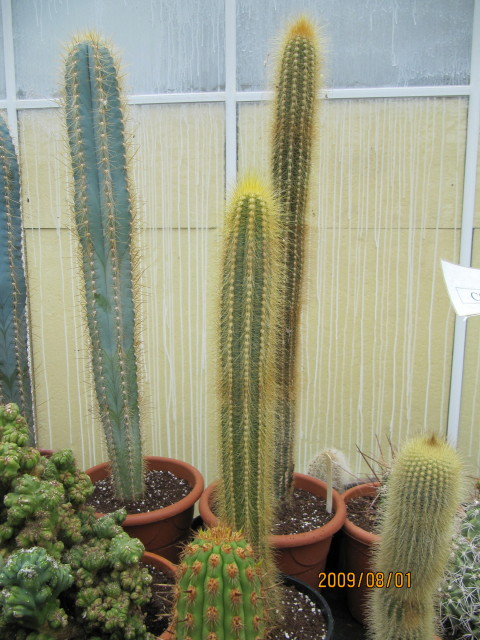

Scientific classification
- Kingdom: Plantae
- Clade: Tracheophytes
- Clade: Angiosperms
- Clade: Eudicots
- Order: Caryophyllales
- Family: Cactaceae
- Subfamily: Cactoideae
- Genus: Pilosocereus
- Species: P. tillianus

Binomial name
- Pilosocereus tillianus R.Gruber & Schatzl

Synonyms
- Pilosocereus lanuginosus subsp. tillianus (R.Gruber & Schatzl) Guiggi

= Pilosocereus tillianus =

Species of flowering plant

Pilosocereus tillianus is a species of flowering plant in the cactus family Cactaceae, native to Venezuela (the state of Mérida). It was first described in 1982.

== Description ==
Pilosocereus tillianus has green to grayish green stems with 11–12 ribs. Its branches are more-or-less upright. The areoles have spines up to 6 cm (2.4 in) long. Flowering areoles have flexible spines and silky hairs up to 3 cm (1.2 in) long in dense tufts. Non-flowering areoles have rigid spines and fewer silky hairs. The flower is 3–3.5 cm (1.2–1.4 in) long with greenish outer segments (tepals) and white inner tepals. The fruit is red.

== Taxonomy ==
Pilosocereus tillianus was first described in 1982. The specific epithet tillianus is assumed to refer to Hans Till, an Austrian cactus specialist. It has been sunk into P. lanuginosus, and also reduced to a subspecies of that species, P. lanuginosus subsp. tillianus. Its relatively short flowers and large number (20–25) of flexible spines distinguish it from P. moritzianus which is also found in Venezuela, and which has also been treated as a subspecies of P. lanuginosus.

== Distribution ==
Pilosocereus tillianus is native to the state of Mérida in Venezuela, where it occurs in area of Lagunillas.
