= Ammocharis baumii =

Scientific classification
- Kingdom: Plantae
- Clade: Embryophytes
- Clade: Tracheophytes
- Clade: Angiosperms
- Clade: Monocots
- Order: Asparagales
- Family: Amaryllidaceae
- Subfamily: Amaryllidoideae
- Genus: Ammocharis
- Species: A. baumii

Binomial name
- Ammocharis baumii (Harms) Milne-Redh. & Schweick.

Synonyms
- Crinum baumii Harms

Species of flowering plant

Ammocharis baumii, commonly known as the Baum's ammocharis, is a flowering plant and geophyte that belongs to the family Amaryllidaceae and is native to Angola, Botswana, Namibia, Zambia and Zimbabwe.
