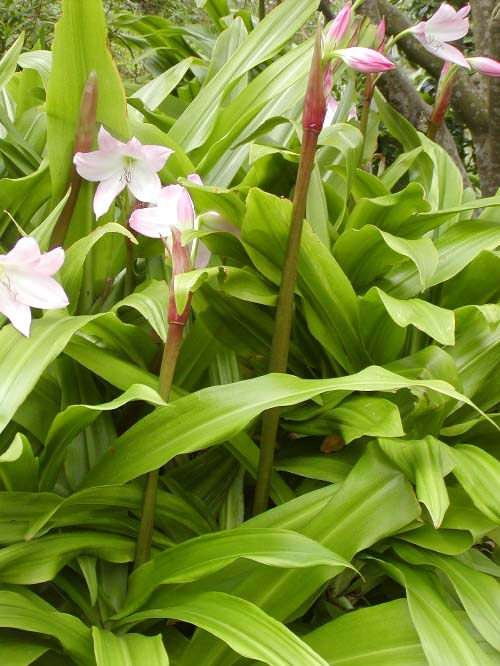
- Crinum moorei

Scientific classification
- Kingdom: Plantae
- Clade: Embryophytes
- Clade: Tracheophytes
- Clade: Angiosperms
- Clade: Monocots
- Order: Asparagales
- Family: Amaryllidaceae
- Subfamily: Amaryllidoideae
- Tribe: Amaryllideae
- Subtribe: Crininae; Baker

Type genus
- Crinum L.

Genera
- See text

Synonyms
- Crineae

= Crininae =

Subtribe of flowering plants

Crininae is one of four subtribes within the tribe Amaryllideae (subfamily Amaryllidoideae, family Amaryllidaceae), with a pantropical distribution (Crinum) and also sub-Saharan Africa.

== Description ==
Leaves frequently show an intercalary meristem and are usually fringed with cartilaginous teeth. The leaf apices are also often truncate (cut off). The flowers may be actinomorphic to zygomorphic, with a perigone tube with free stamens. The fruit is indehiscent, irregular, and often rostellate (rosetted). The scape does not abscise (shed) during seed dispersal, with the exception of Ammocharis longifolia where it detaches at ground level. The seeds also lack an integument, but are endosperm-rich and partially chlorophyllous with cork-covering.

== Taxonomy ==
=== Phylogeny ===
Crininae are phylogenetically placed within the Amaryllideae as follows:

- Tribe Amaryllideae
  - Subtribe Amaryllidinae
  - - Subtribe Boophoninae
    - - Subtribe Strumariinae
      - Subtribe Crininae

== Subdivision ==
As circumscribed by Meerow et al. (2001), there were three genera (Species), although the precise relationship between Cybistetes and Amocharis has been problematic, having been segregated in 1939 but later restored in 2007, submerging Cybistetes within Ammocharis as A. longifolia:

Genera (species):

- Crinum (65)
- Ammocharis (6)

== Distribution ==
The subtribe is widespread in the tropics (pantropical) and sub-Saharan Africa.

== Bibliography ==
- Milne-Redhead, E.; Schweickerdt, H. G. (October 1939). "A new conception of the genus Ammocharis Herb". Journal of the Linnean Society of London, Botany. 52 (342): 159–197. doi:10.1111/j.1095-8339.1939.tb01601.x.
- Meerow, Alan W.; Lehmiller, David J.; Clayton, Jason R. (March 2003). "Phylogeny and biogeography of Crinum L. (Amaryllidaceae) inferred from nuclear and limited plastid non-coding DNA sequences". Botanical Journal of the Linnean Society. 141 (3): 349–363. doi:10.1046/j.1095-8339.2003.00142.x. Archived from the original on 2016-03-05.
- Kwembeya, Ezekeil G.; Bjorå, Charlotte S.; Stedje, Brita; Nordal, Inger (1 August 2007). "Phylogenetic Relationships in the Genus Crinum (Amaryllidaceae) with Emphasis on Tropical African Species: Evidence from trnL-F and Nuclear ITS DNA Sequence Data". Taxon. 56 (3): 801. doi:10.2307/25065863. JSTOR 25065863.
- Müller-Doblies, U.; Müller-Doblies, D. (1996). "Tribes and subtribes and some species combinations in Amaryllidaceae J St Hil R Dahlgren & al. 1985". Feddes Repertorium. 107 (5–6): S.c.1–S.c.9.
- Meerow, Alan W.; Snijman, Deirdre A. (December 2001). "Phylogeny of Amaryllidaceae Tribe Amaryllideae Based on nrDNA ITS Sequences and Morphology". American Journal of Botany. 88 (12): 2321–2330. doi:10.2307/3558392. JSTOR 3558392. PMID 21669663. Archived from the original on 2019-02-26.
- Snijman, D. A.; Linder, H. P. (1996). "Phylogenetic Relationships, Seed Characters, and Dispersal System Evolution in Amaryllideae (Amaryllidaceae)". Annals of the Missouri Botanical Garden. 83 (3): 362–386. doi:10.2307/2399866. JSTOR 2399866.
- Vigneron, Pascal (2008). "Amaryllidaceae". Amaryllidaceae.org (in French). Archived from the original on 4 January 2015.
- "Amaryllidaceae: A taxonomic tool for the Amaryllidaceae of the world". eMonocot. Archived from the original on 2016-03-04.
- Katja Weiehhardt-Kulessa, Thomas Bórner, Jiirgen Sehmitz, Ute Müller-Doblies, and Dietrich Müller-Doblies. 2000. Controversial taxonomy of Strumariinae (Amaryllidaceae) investigated by nuclear rDNA (ITS) sequences. 1. Hessea, Namaquanula, Kamiesbergia, and Dewinterella. Plant Syst. Evol. 223:1-13 (2000)
- Germishuizen, G.; Meyer, N.L., eds. (2003). "Plants of Southern Africa: an annotated checklist" (PDF). Strelitzia. 14 (i–vi): 1–1231. Archived from the original (PDF) on 2011-06-27. (online version)
- Snijman, D. A.; Kolberg, H. (2011). "Ammocharis deserticola (Amaryllideae), a new species from Namibia and a key to species of the genus" (PDF). Bothalia. 41 (2): 308–311. doi:10.4102/abc.v41i2.69. Archived from the original (PDF) on 2017-01-02.
