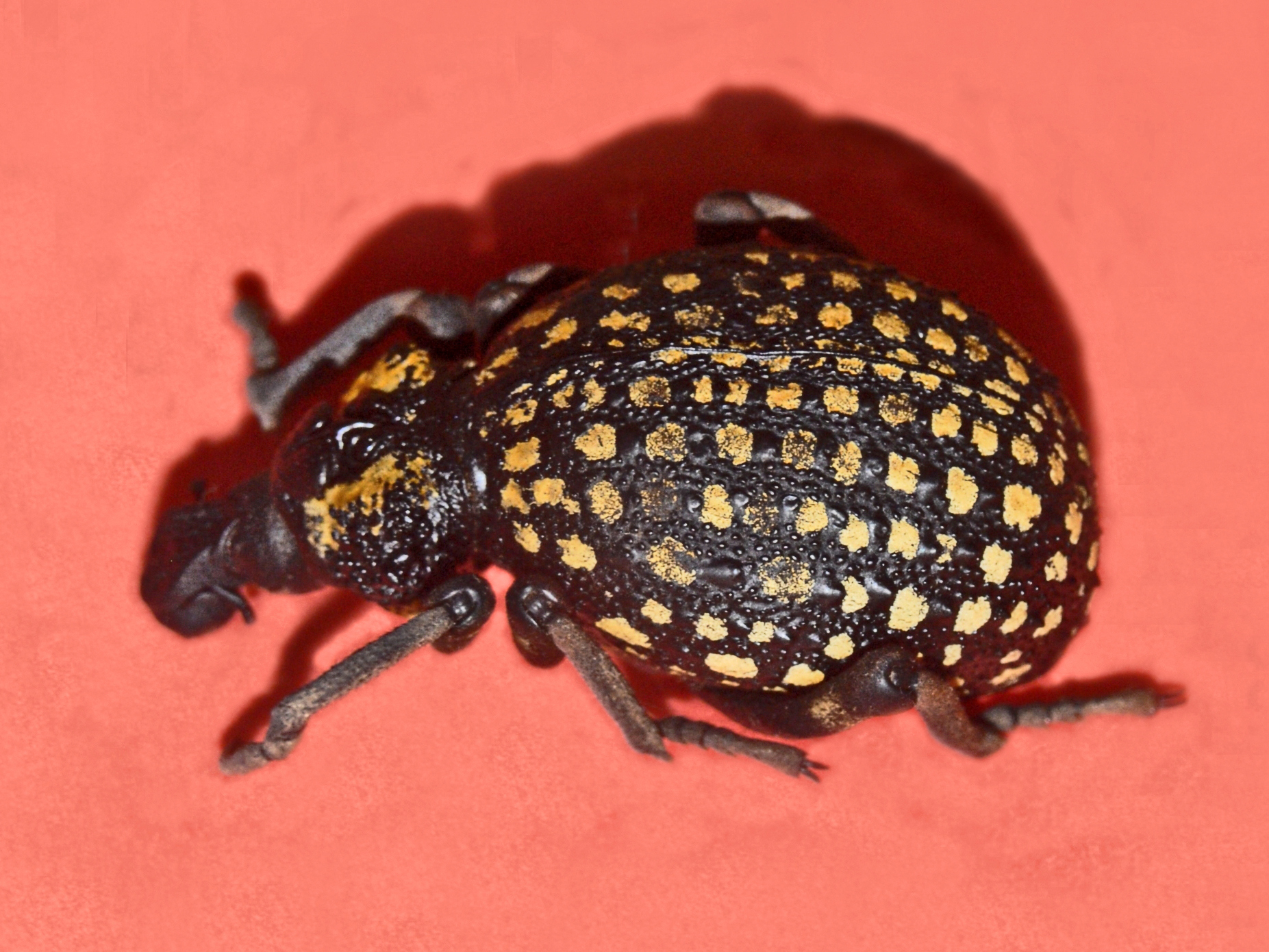
- Museum specimen of Brachycerus bufo

Scientific classification
- Kingdom: Animalia
- Phylum: Arthropoda
- Clade: Pancrustacea
- Class: Insecta
- Order: Coleoptera
- Suborder: Polyphaga
- Infraorder: Cucujiformia
- Superfamily: Curculionoidea
- Family: Brachyceridae
- Genus: Brachycerus
- Species: B. bufo

Binomial name
- Brachycerus bufo Boheman, 1845

= Brachycerus bufo =

Species of beetle

Brachycerus bufo is a species of weevil in the family Curculionidae, subfamily Brachycerinae.

== Description ==
Brachycerus bufo reaches a length of about 20 millimetres (0.79 in). The body is black, with yellowish spots. The abdomen is rounded. "Bufo", meaning toad, is so named because of the irregular surface of its carapace.
