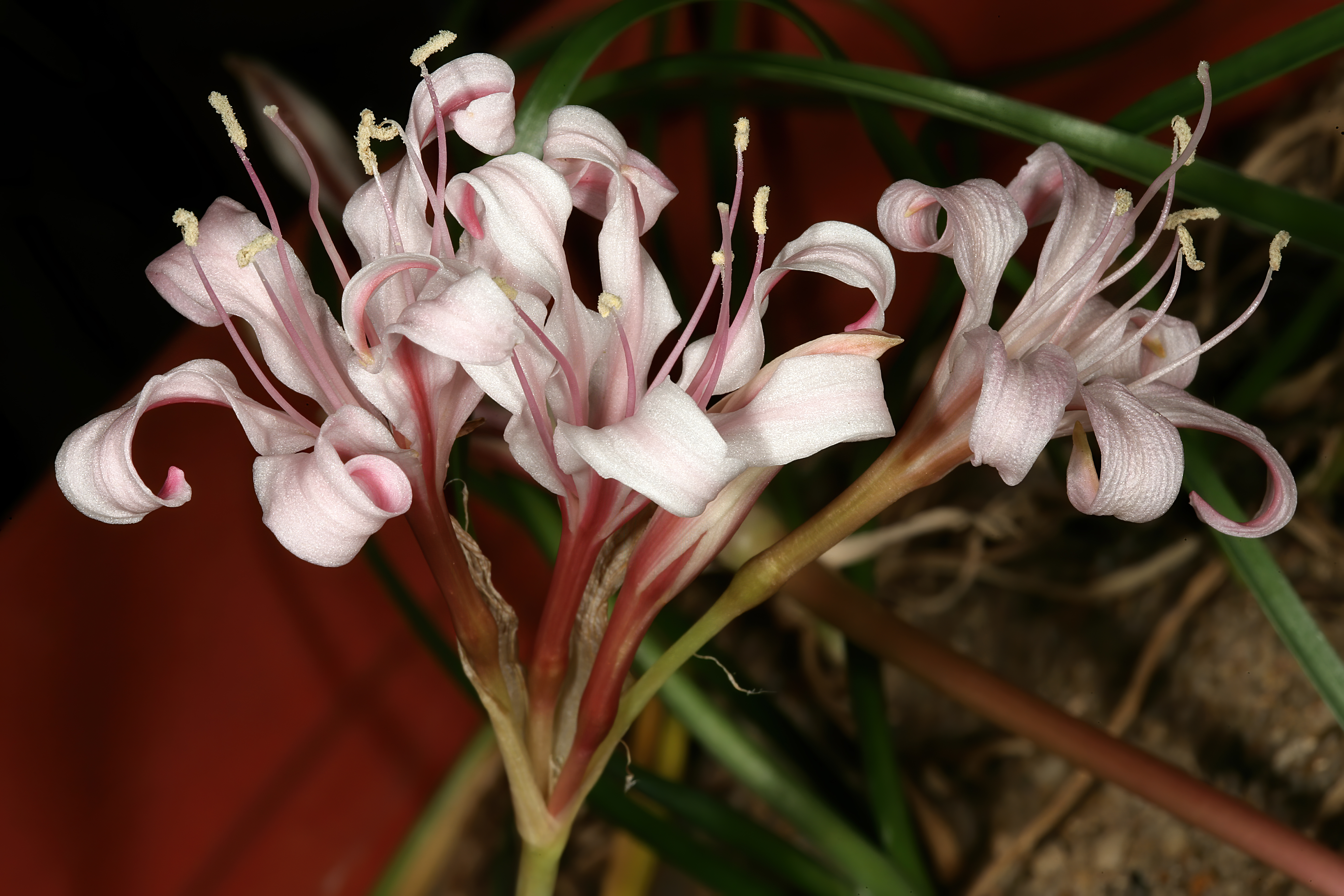

Scientific classification
- Kingdom: Plantae
- Clade: Tracheophytes
- Clade: Angiosperms
- Clade: Monocots
- Order: Asparagales
- Family: Amaryllidaceae
- Subfamily: Amaryllidoideae
- Genus: Ammocharis
- Species: A. nerinoides

Binomial name
- Ammocharis nerinoides (Baker) Lehmiller

Synonyms
- Crinum nerinoides Baker

= Ammocharis nerinoides =

Species of flowering plant

Ammocharis nerinoides is a plant species endemic to Namibia, known from the Gobabis and Etoshapan Districts. It occurs in desert regions in river beds occasionally flooded with seasonal rainfall. It is also cultivated elsewhere for its showy flowers.

Ammocharis nerinoides is a perennial herb forming egg-shaped bulbs up to 50 mm in diameter. It has 4-10 leaves, distichously arranged, narrow, up to 40 cm long, with very small teeth along the margins. Flowering stalk is flattened, reddish-green, up to 12 cm tall. Flowers are borne in an umbel of up to 7 pink flowers.
