= Ammocharis deserticola =

Scientific classification
- Kingdom: Plantae
- Clade: Tracheophytes
- Clade: Angiosperms
- Clade: Monocots
- Order: Asparagales
- Family: Amaryllidaceae
- Subfamily: Amaryllidoideae
- Genus: Ammocharis
- Species: A. deserticola

Binomial name
- Ammocharis deserticola Snijman & Kolberg.

Species of flowering plant

Ammocharis deserticola is a flowering plant and geophyte that belongs to the family Amaryllidaceae and is endemic to Namibia.
