= Pilosocereus moritzianus =

Scientific classification
- Kingdom: Plantae
- Clade: Tracheophytes
- Clade: Angiosperms
- Clade: Eudicots
- Order: Caryophyllales
- Family: Cactaceae
- Subfamily: Cactoideae
- Genus: Pilosocereus
- Species: P. moritzianus

Binomial name
- Pilosocereus moritzianus (Otto ex Pfeiff.) Byles & G.D.Rowley

Synonyms
- List: Cephalocereus backebergii (Weing.) Borg; Cephalocereus claroviridis (Backeb.) Borg; Cephalocereus moritzianus (Otto ex Pfeiff.) Britton & Rose; Cereus backebergii Weing.; Cereus claroviridis Backeb.; Cereus moritzianus Otto ex Pfeiff.; Pilocereus claroviridis (Backeb.) Backeb.; Pilocereus moritzianus (Otto ex Pfeiff.) Lem.; Pilosocereus backebergii (Weing.) Byles & G.D.Rowley; Pilosocereus claroviridis (Backeb.) Byles & G.D.Rowley; Pilosocereus lanuginosus subsp. moritzianus (Otto ex Pfeiff.) Guiggi

Species of cactus

Pilosocereus moritzianus is a species of flowering plant in the cactus family Cactaceae, native to Trinidad and Tobago and the Venezuelan Antilles in the Caribbean and to Venezuela in northern South America. It was first described in 1837 as Cereus moritzianus. It was subsequently placed in the genus Cephalocereus before being moved to Pilosocereus in 1957. It has also been treated as a subspecies of Pilosocereus lanuginosus, P. lanuginosus subsp. moritzianus.

== Description ==
Pilosocereus moritzianus has green to somewhat bluish green stems with 7–10 ribs. Its branches are ascending, some completely upright. The areoles have rigid spines up to 3.5 cm (1.4 in) long that are yellow to brown when young. Flowering areoles have dense tufts of silky hairs up to 5 cm (2.0 in) long. Non-flowering areoles have fewer hairs. The flowers are 5–7 cm (2.0–2.8 in) long with bluish green outer segments (tepals) and white inner segments. The fruit is red.

== Taxonomy ==
Pilosocereus moritzianus was first described by in 1837 by Ludwig Pfeiffer as Cereus moritzianus, with the name ascribed to Christoph Friedrich Otto. The epithet moritzianus is assumed to refer to Johann Moritz, a German naturalist who lived in Venezuela. It was placed in the genus Pilosocereus in 1957.

It has been treated as part of P. lanuginosus, including as a coastal variant of that species. Alternatively, it has been recognized as a distinct taxon, but only as a subspecies, P. lanuginosus subsp. moritzianus.

== Distribution ==
As of June 2025, Plants of the World Online records the distribution of Pilosocereus moritzianus as Trinidad and Tobago, Venezuela, and the Venezuelan Antilles. In Venezuela, it is known from Caracas, and the states of Carabobo and Vargas; in the Venezuelan Antilles, it is present in Patos Island. It has also been said to be present in Colombia.
