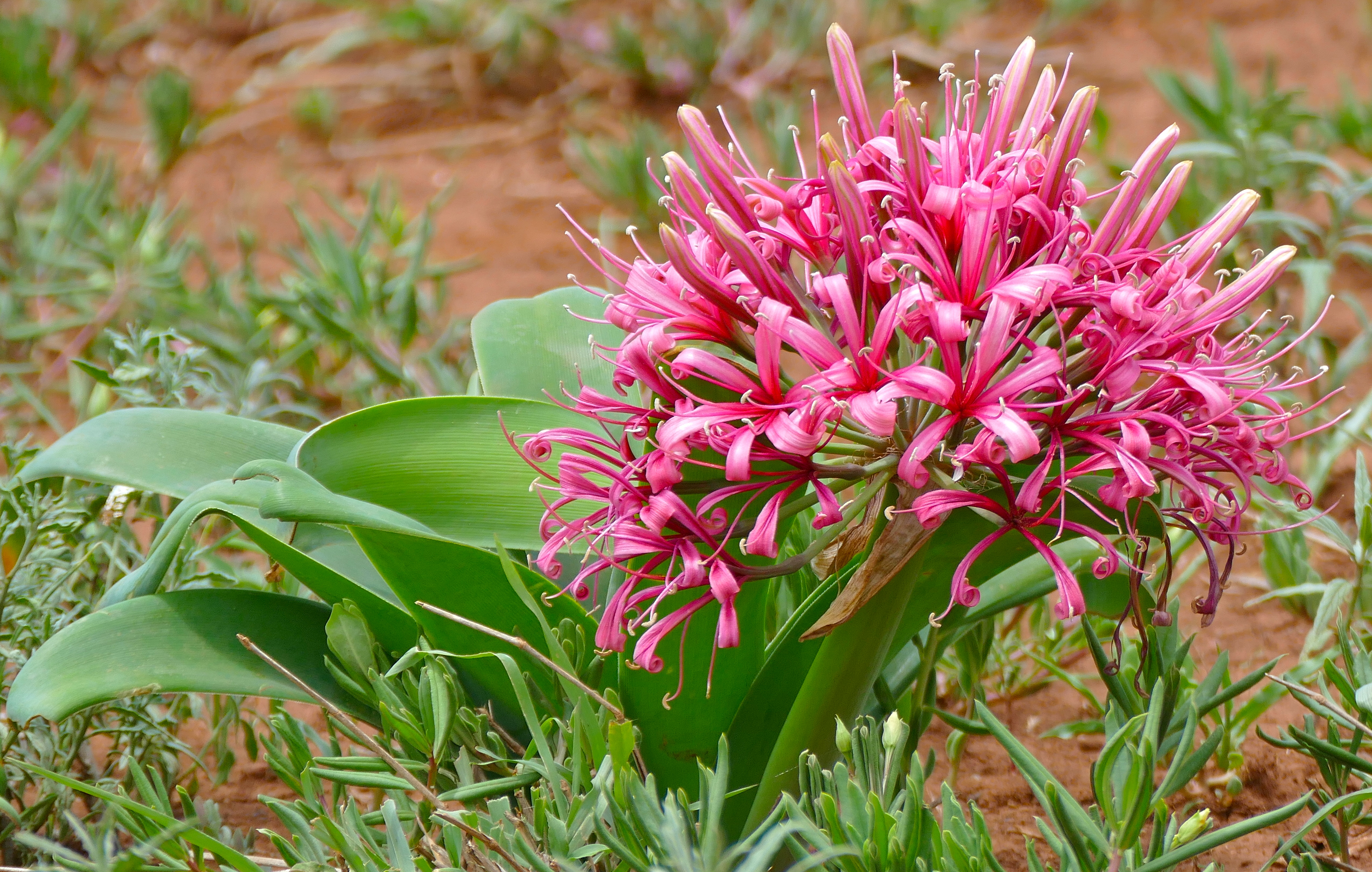

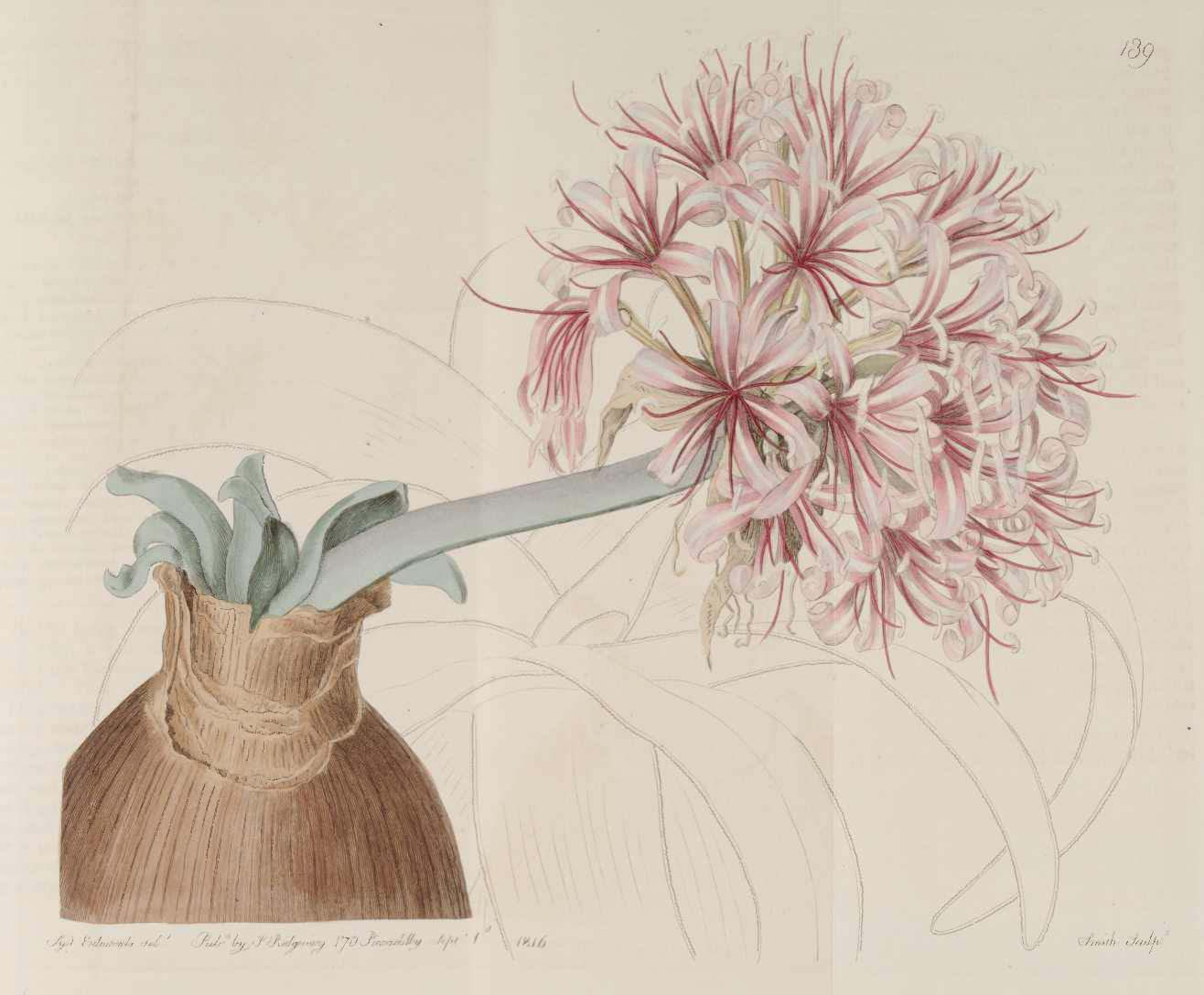

Scientific classification
- Kingdom: Plantae
- Clade: Tracheophytes
- Clade: Angiosperms
- Clade: Monocots
- Order: Asparagales
- Family: Amaryllidaceae
- Subfamily: Amaryllidoideae
- Genus: Ammocharis
- Species: A. coranica

Binomial name
- Ammocharis coranica (Ker Gawl.) Herb.

Synonyms
- Amaryllis coranica Ker Gawl.; Amaryllis coranica var. pallida Lindl.; Ammocharis coccinea Pax; Ammocharis coranica var. pallida (Lindl.) Herb.; Ammocharis taveliana Schinz; Brunsvigia coranica (Ker Gawl.) Ker Gawl.; Crinum coccineum (Pax) Fritsch; Crinum tavelianum (Schinz) Fritsch; Palinetes coranica (Ker Gawl.) Salisb.

= Ammocharis coranica =

Species of flowering plant

Ammocharis coranica, commonly known as the Karoo lily or sore-eye flower, is a flowering plant and geophyte that belongs to the family Amaryllidaceae and is native to South Africa where it occurs in all the provinces. It is also native to Angola, Botswana, Eswatini, Lesotho, Namibia and Zimbabwe.
