= Snijman =

Snijman is a surname. Notable people with the surname include:

- Dierdré A. Snijman (born 1949), South African botanist
- Esaias Reynier Snijman (1822–1884), South African politician
