= Paul Hermann (botanist) =

German botanist of the 17th century

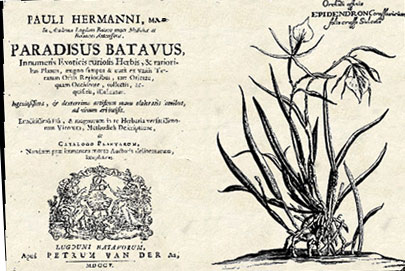
Paradisus batavus by Paul Hermann, Leyden, 2nd Edn. 1705

Paul Hermann (30 June 1646, Halle – 29 January 1695, Leiden) was a German-born physician and botanist who for 15 years was director of the Hortus Botanicus Leiden.

Born in Halle, Duchy of Magdeburg, Margraviate of Brandenburg, Paul Hermann was the son of Johann Hermann, a well-known organist, and Maria Magdalena Röber, a clergyman's daughter. Hermann studied theology and medicine in Wittenberg and botany in Leipzig. After graduating from Europe's finest medical school, Padua in 1670, he was then engaged by the Dutch East India Company and went to Ceylon (now Sri Lanka) as a Ship's Medical Officer. He was in their employ from 1672 to 1677. During his stay there, he made a scientific collection of this island's plants and other organisms. He was then offered the job at Leiden and took up the Chair of Botany at the University of Leiden in 1679 and took up his residence in 1680 at Leiden where he spent the rest of his professional life. He immediately set to making it the finest botanical garden in Europe.

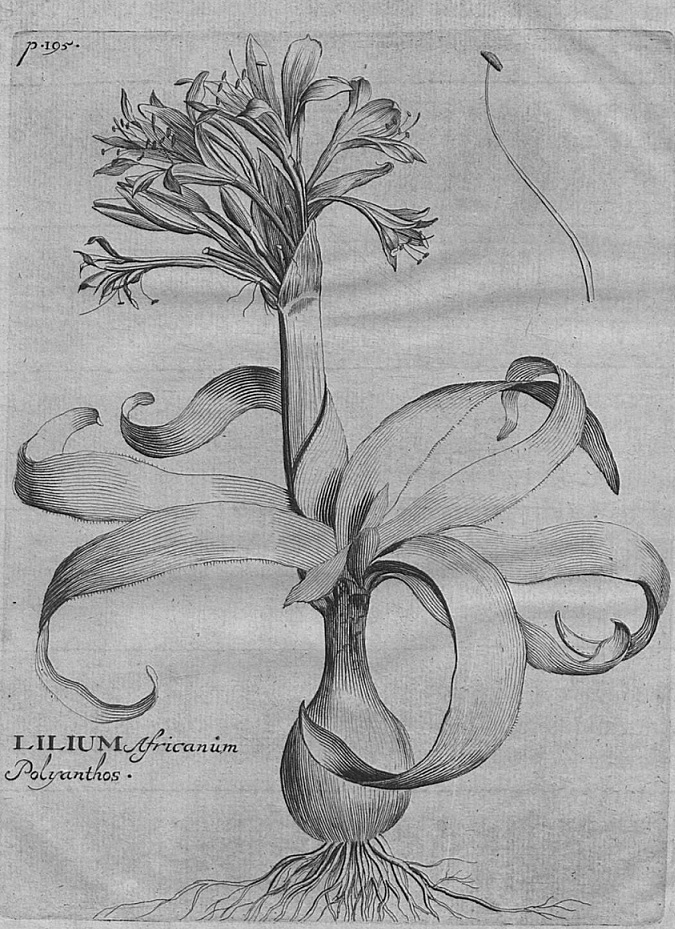
Lilium Africanum Polyanthos in Paradisus batavus, 1698

Hermann's Paradisus batavus, a description of the plants of the Leyden university botanical garden, was published three years after his death in 1698 and edited by William Sherard. There was a second edition published in 1705. Sherard edited his notes and solicited patronage for the publication of this important book. They were students together of Tournefort in Paris in 1688. This is where Hermann perfected his botanical draughtsmanship. Later Sherard collected more of his notes and produced a catalog published as Musaeum Zeylanicum (1717, 2nd edn.: 1727). Hermann's original Ceylon collection was used by Carl Linnaeus when he wrote his Flora Zeylanica (1747) and Species plantarum (1753), using the abbreviation "Hermann herb." in those publications. After Hermann's collections had passed through many hands, they were eventually purchased by Sir Joseph Banks. Now they are kept at the Natural History Museum in London. Hermann was a very good botanical illustrator and had an excellent botanical grasp as declared by Linnaeus himself.

After his death, his widow, Anna (née Stomphius, his second wife, his first Isabella Borman, having died within a year of their marriage) corresponded with several botanists based in England including William Sherard, James Petiver and Hans Sloane about publishing her husband's unpublished manuscripts. She was in London from February 1702 to early 1703. It is likely that she visited Tunbridge Wells during this time since there is a specimen within Hans Sloane's herbarium (now in the Natural History Museum, London) labelled 'Lichen found a[bou]t Tunbridge by Madam Herman'. It comprises a mat of a thallose liverwort as well as several mosses. This is the earliest known collection of bryophytes made by a woman in Britain.

== Works ==
- Cynosura materiae medicae : ante sedecim annos in lucem emissa, brevibusque annotatis exornata a Joh. Sigismundo Henningero, nunc diffusius explanata, et compositorum Medicamentorum Recensione aucta.... Argentorati : Beck, 1726 Digital edition of the University and State Library Düsseldorf.
- Horti Academici Lugduno-Batavi Catalogus. 1687 (Internet Archive, BSB).
- Florae Lugduno-Batavae flores. 1690 (BSB).
- Hermann, Paul (1705) [1698]. Paradisus Batavus, Continens Plus centum Plantas affabre aere incisas & Descriptionibus illustratas; Cui Accessit Catalogus Plantarum, quas pro Tomis nondum editis, delineandas curaverat (2nd ed.). Leiden: Elzevier.
- Cynosura Materiae Medicae…. Spoor, Straßburg 1710 (online; edited by Johann Sigismund Henninger), (1726 edition at University and State Library Düsseldorf).
