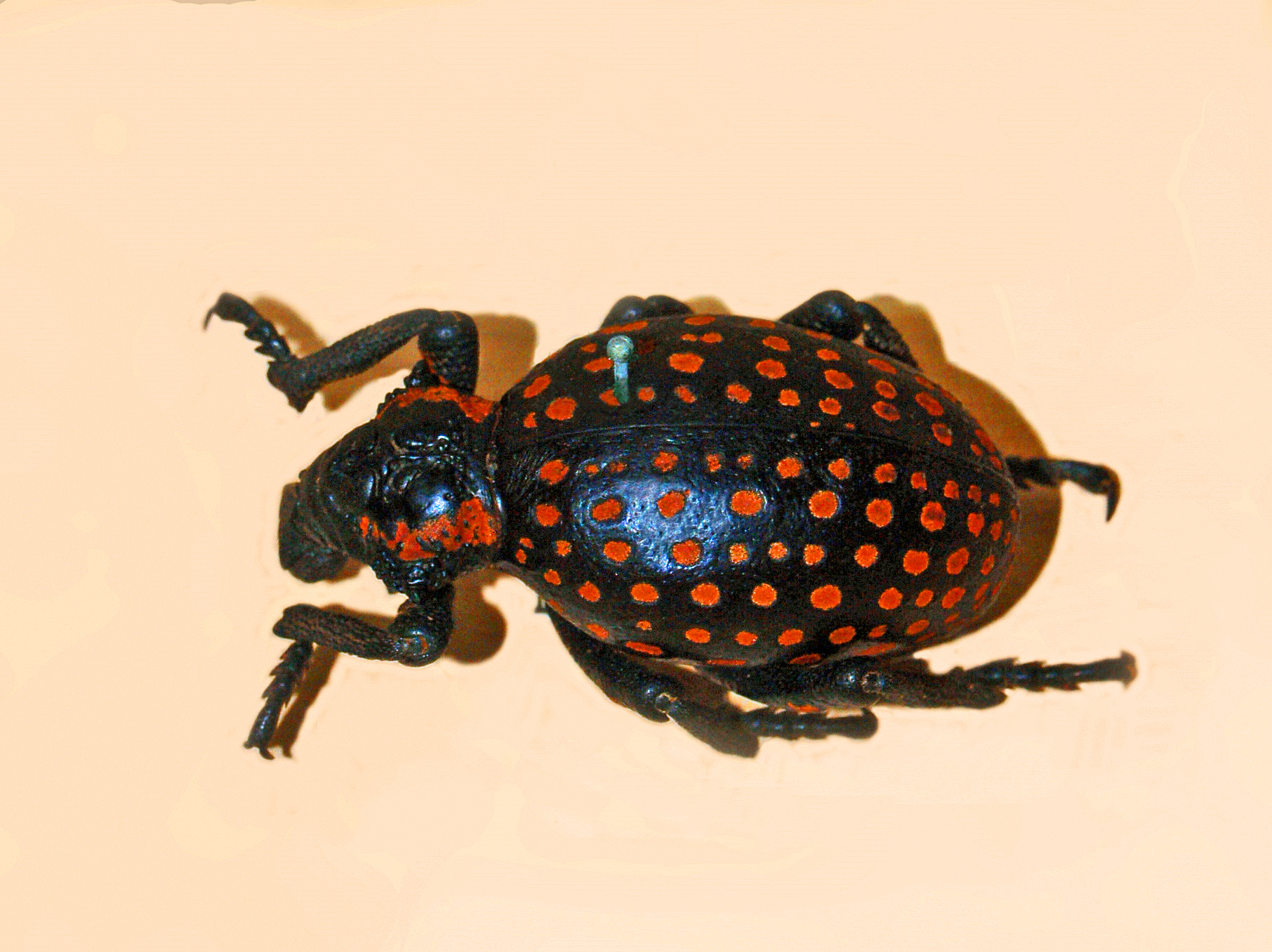
- Brachycerus ornatus from South-Western Africa

Scientific classification
- Kingdom: Animalia
- Phylum: Arthropoda
- Class: Insecta
- Order: Coleoptera
- Suborder: Polyphaga
- Infraorder: Cucujiformia
- Family: Brachyceridae
- Subfamily: Brachycerinae; Billberg, 1820

Tribes
- See text

Synonyms
- Erirhininae Schoenherr, 1825; Raymondionyminae Reitter, 1913

= Brachycerinae =

Subfamily of beetles

Brachycerinae is a weevil subfamily in the family Brachyceridae.

== Tribes ==
Tribus group "Brachycerinae":

- Brachycerini - Brotheusini - Byrsopini - Protomantini

Tribus group "Erirhininae":

- Arthrostenini - Erirhinini - Himasthlophallini - Stenopelmini - Tanysphyrini - †Palaeoerirhinini

Tribus group "Ocladiinae":

- Desmidophorini - Ocladiini

Tribus group "Raymondionyminae":

- Myrtonymini - Raymondionymini

Tribus group "Tadiinae":

- Aonychusini - Tadiini

Tribus group unknown:

- Cryptolaryngini
