= Herold Georg Wilhelm Johannes Schweickerdt =

German botanist

- Born: 28 February 1903; Schmie, Baden-Württemberg, Germany
- Died: 21 February 1977 (aged 73); Pretoria, South Africa
- Scientific career
- Fields: Botany; Biology
- Author abbrev. (botany): Schweick.

Herold Georg Wilhelm Johannes Schweickerdt (28 February 1903, Schmie, Baden-Württemberg – 21 February 1977, Pretoria) was a German botanist.

In 1904 he moved with his parents to Pretoria, where he later studied at Transvaal University. From 1922 to 1924 he was a student at the University of Bonn (1922–24), later becoming a professor in Pretoria. From 1940 to 1964 he served as inspector of the Botanical Garden at the University of Göttingen.

During his career he collected plants in Transvaal, South-West Africa, Rhodesia, Mozambique and Natal. The plant species Gasteria schweickerdtiana is named after him.

The H.G.W.J Schweickerdt Herbarium (PRU) at the University of Pretoria is named in his honour.

== Publications ==
- Untersuchungen über Photodinese bei Vallisneria spiralis, 1928 - Studies on photodinese in Vallisneria spiralis.
