= List of Daphnia species =

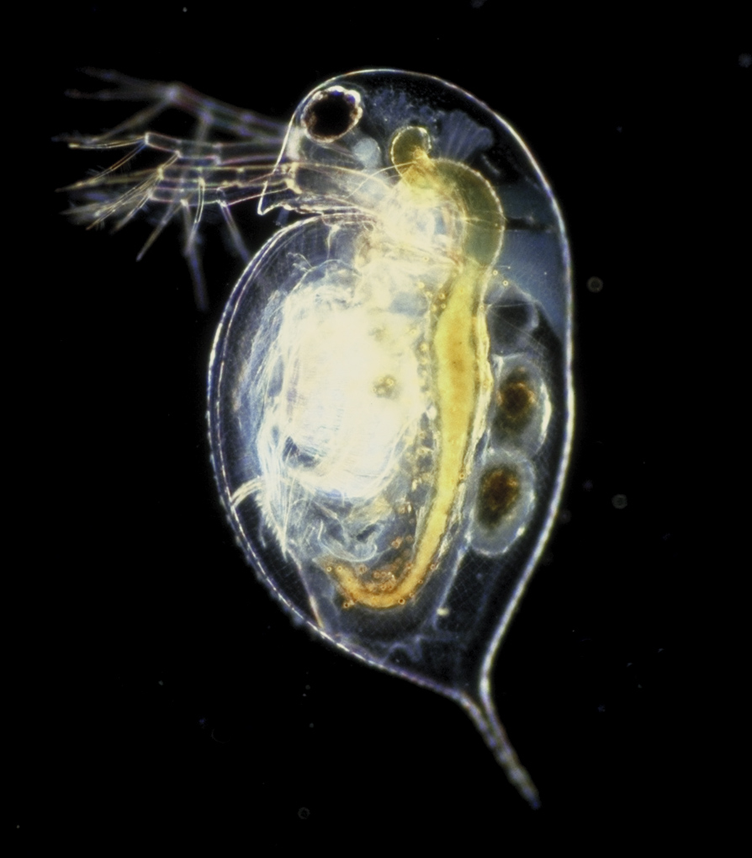
Daphnia pulex

The genus Daphnia (Crustacea: Cladocera: Daphniidae) contains over 200 species of water fleas, many of which are in need of further taxonomic investigation (species inquirendae; marked with asterisks). The species are divided among three subgenera, with a number of species incertae sedis.

== Subgenus Australodaphnia Colbourne, Wilson & Hebert, 2006 ==
- Daphnia occidentalis Benzie, 1986

== Subgenus Ctenodaphnia Dybowski & Grochowski, 1895 ==
- Daphnia atkinsoni Baird, 1859
- Daphnia australis (Sergeev & Williams, 1985)
- Daphnia barbata Weltner, 1898
- Daphnia bolivari Richard, 1888
- Daphnia brooksi Dodson, 1985
- Daphnia carinata King, 1853
- Daphnia cephalata King, 1853
- Daphnia chevreuxi Richard, 1896
- Daphnia chilensis (Hann, 1986)
- Daphnia coronata Sars, 1916
- Daphnia dadayana Paggi, 1999
- Daphnia deserti Gauthier, 1937
- Daphnia dolichocephala Sars, 1895
- Daphnia ephemeralis (Schwartz & Hebert, 1985)
- Daphnia exilis Herrick, 1895
- Daphnia fusca Gurney, 1907
- Daphnia gelida (Brady, 1918)
- Daphnia gibba Methuen, 1910
- Daphnia gravis King, 1853*
- Daphnia hispanica Glagolev & Alonso, 1990
- Daphnia inca Kořínek & Villalobos, 2003
- Daphnia jollyi Petkovski, 1973
- Daphnia longicephala Hebert, 1977*
- Daphnia magna Straus, 1820
- Daphnia magniceps Herrick, 1884
- Daphnia mediterranea Alonso, 1985
- Daphnia menucoensis Paggi, 1996
- Daphnia nivalis Hebert, 1977
- Daphnia ornithocephala Birabén, 1953
- Daphnia paggii Kotov, Sinev & Berrios, 2010
- Daphnia projecta Hebert, 1977*
- Daphnia pusilla (Serventy, 1929)
- Daphnia quadrangula (Sergeev, 1990)
- Daphnia queenslandensis (Sergeev, 1990)
- Daphnia salina Hebert & Finston, 1993
- Daphnia semilumaris Flössner, 1987*
- Daphnia similis Claus, 1876
- Daphnia similoides Hudec, 1991
- Daphnia spinulata Birabén, 1917
- Daphnia studeri (Rühe, 1914)
- Daphnia thomsoni Sars, 1894*
- Daphnia tibetana (Sars, 1903)
- Daphnia triquetra Sars, 1903
- Daphnia truncata (Hebert & Wilson, 2000)
- Daphnia wankeltae Hebert, 1977
- Daphnia wardi (Hebert & Wilson, 2000)

== Subgenus Daphnia O. F. Müller, 1785 ==
- Daphnia ambigua (Scourfield, 1947)
- Daphnia arcuata (Forbes, 1893)*
- Daphnia arenaria (Forbes, 1893)*
- Daphnia arenata (Hebert, 1995)
- Daphnia bairdii (Forest, 1879)*
- Daphnia catawba (Coker, 1926)
- Daphnia caudata (Sars, 1863)*
- Daphnia cavicervix (Ekman, 1900)
- Daphnia cheraphila (Hebert & Finston, 1996)
- Daphnia clathrata (Forbes, 1893)*
- Daphnia commutata (Ekman, 1900)
- Daphnia cristata (Sars, 1862)
- Daphnia cucullata (Sars, 1862)
- Daphnia curvirostris (Eylmann, 1887)
- Daphnia denticulata (Birge, 1879)*
- Daphnia dentifera (Forbes, 1893)
- Daphnia dubia (Herrick, 1883)
- Daphnia elongata (Woltereck, 1932)*
- Daphnia ezoensis (Uéno, 1972)*
- Daphnia frigidolimnetica (Ekman, 1904)*
- Daphnia galeata (Sars, 1864)
- Daphnia gessneri (Herbst, 1967)
- Daphnia gibbera (Kortchagin, 1887)*
- Daphnia hyalina (Leydig, 1860)
- Daphnia intexta (Forbes, 1890)*
- Daphnia lacustris (Sars, 1862)
- Daphnia laevis (Birge, 1879)
- Daphnia latipalpa (Moniez, 1888)*
- Daphnia latispina (Kořínek & Hebert, 1996)
- Daphnia litoralis (Sars, 1890)*
- Daphnia longiremis (Sars, 1862)
- Daphnia longispina (O. F. Müller, 1776)
- Daphnia lumholtzi (Sars, 1885)
- Daphnia macraocula (Kiser, 1950)*
- Daphnia marcahuasensis (Valdivia Villar & Burger, 1989)
- Daphnia melanica (Hebert, 1995)
- Daphnia mendotae (Birge, 1918)
- Daphnia middendorffiana (Fischer, 1851)
- Daphnia minnehaha (Herrick, 1884)
- Daphnia mitsukuri (Ishikawa, 1896)*
- Daphnia monacha (Brehm, 1912)*
- Daphnia morsei (Ishikawa, 1895)
- Daphnia nasuta (Herrick, 1884)*
- Daphnia neoobtusa (Hebert, 1995)
- Daphnia obtusa (Kurz, 1874)
- Daphnia oregonensis (Kořínek & Hebert, 1996)
- Daphnia parapulex (Woltereck, 1932)*
- Daphnia parvula (Fordyce, 1901)
- Daphnia peruviana (Harding, 1955)
- Daphnia pileata (Hebert & Finston, 1996)
- Daphnia prolata (Hebert & Finston, 1996)
- Daphnia propinqua (Sars, 1895)*
- Daphnia pulex (Leydig, 1860)
- Daphnia pulicaria (Forbes, 1893)
- Daphnia pulicarioides (Burckhardt, 1899)*
- Daphnia pulicoides (Woltereck, 1932)*
- Daphnia retrocurva (Forbes, 1882)
- Daphnia rosea (Sars, 1862)
- Daphnia schmackeri (Poppe, 1890)*
- Daphnia schoedleri (Sars, 1862)*
- Daphnia sinevi (Kotov, Ishida & Taylor, 2006)
- Daphnia sonkulensis (Manujlova, 1964)*
- Daphnia tanakai (Ishida, Kotov & Taylor, 2006)
- Daphnia thorata (Forbes, 1893)
- Daphnia titicacensis (Birge, 1909)*
- Daphnia turbinata (Sars, 1903)
- Daphnia typica (Mackin, 1931)*
- Daphnia umbra (Taylor et al., 1996)
- Daphnia ventrosa (Kortchagin, 1887)*
- Daphnia villosa (Kořínek & Hebert, 1996)
- Daphnia whitmani (Ishikawa, 1896)*
- Daphnia zschokkei (Stingelin, 1894)*

== Incertae sedis ==
- Daphnia abrupta Haldeman, 1842*
- Daphnia acuminirostris Lucas, 1896*
- Daphnia affinis Sars, 1863*
- Daphnia alluaudi Richard, 1896*
- Daphnia americana Fordyce, 1904*
- Daphnia angulata Say, 1818*
- Daphnia angulifera Forbes, 1893*
- Daphnia balchashensis Manujlova, 1948*
- Daphnia berolinensis (Schoedler, 1866)*
- Daphnia biwaensis Uéno, 1934*
- Daphnia bohemica Burckhardt, 1899*
- Daphnia brasiliensis Lubbock, 1854*
- Daphnia brevicauda Chambers, 1877*
- Daphnia cyclocephala Burckhardt, 1899*
- Daphnia decipiens Burckhardt, 1899*
- Daphnia degenerata Schmankewitsch, 1875*
- Daphnia dolichocantha (Dybowsky & Grochowski, 1895)*
- Daphnia dorsalis Rafinesque, 1817*
- Daphnia echinata Schmarda, 1854*
- Daphnia ephippiata Koch, 1841*
- Daphnia eurycephala (Daday, 1911)*
- Daphnia expansa Sars, 1914*
- Daphnia foreli Burckhardt, 1899*
- Daphnia friedeli Hartwig, 1897*
- Daphnia granaria Nicolet, 1849*
- Daphnia gravis Schödler, 1877*
- Daphnia hamata Brady, 1898*
- Daphnia heuscheri Burckhardt, 1899*
- Daphnia himalaya Manca, Martin, Peñalva-Arana & Benzie, 2006*
- Daphnia hodgsoni Sars, 1916*
- Daphnia honorata King, 1853*
- Daphnia hybus Ross, 1897*
- Daphnia insulana Moniez, 1889*
- Daphnia intermedia (Studer, 1878)*
- Daphnia izpodvala Kotov & Taylor, 2010
- Daphnia juvensis Burckhardt, 1899*
- Daphnia katrajensis Rane, Jafri & Rafiq, 1992*
- Daphnia kerusses Cox, 1883*
- Daphnia kingi Schödler, 1877*
- Daphnia kirimensis Weltner, 1898*
- Daphnia kisilkumensis Schödler, 1877*
- Daphnia lamellata Sars, 1914*
- Daphnia leucocephala Sars, 1903*
- Daphnia leydigi P. E. Müller, 1867*
- Daphnia longicornis Sars, 1890*
- Daphnia macrura Dana, 1852*
- Daphnia major Brady, 1898*
- Daphnia melanea Dufresne & Hebert, 1994*
- Daphnia minnesotensis Herrick, 1895*
- Daphnia mirabilis Stingelin, 1915*
- Daphnia neglecta Burckhardt, 1899*
- Daphnia newporti Baird, 1859*
- Daphnia notodonvarani Zacharias, 1905*
- Daphnia pacifica Taylor, Finston & Hebert, 1998*
- Daphnia palaearctica Behning, 1928*
- Daphnia procumbens Sars, 1890*
- Daphnia psittacea Baird, 1850*
- Daphnia pusilla (Sars, 1890)*
- Daphnia ramosa Koch, 1841*
- Daphnia reticulata Haldeman, 1843*
- Daphnia richardi Burckhardt, 1899*
- Daphnia rotundata Say, 1818*
- Daphnia rotundata Burckhardt, 1899*
- Daphnia rudis Schmankewitsch, 1875*
- Daphnia sarsi (Langhans, 1911)*
- Daphnia serrulata Daday, 1884*
- Daphnia silvestrii Daday, 1902*
- Daphnia sima Schödler, 1863*
- Daphnia simulans Sars, 1903*
- Daphnia spinosa Herrick, 1879*
- Daphnia stenocephala (Daday, 1911)*
- Daphnia tarasca Kraus, 1986*
- Daphnia tenuirostris Sars, 1890*
- Daphnia tenuispina Sars, 1916*
- Daphnia textilis Dana, 1852*
- Daphnia ulomskyi Behning, 1941*
- Daphnia variabilis Langhans, 1911*
- Daphnia ventricosa Hellich, 1877*
- Daphnia vernalis Sars, 1890*
- Daphnia wierzejskii Richard, 1896*
- Daphnia wierzejskii Lityński, 1913*
