= Ceriodaphnia dubia =

Scientific classification
- Kingdom: Animalia
- Phylum: Arthropoda
- Class: Branchiopoda
- Subclass: Phyllopoda
- Superorder: Diplostraca
- Order: Anomopoda
- Family: Daphniidae
- Genus: Ceriodaphnia
- Species: C. dubia

Binomial name
- Ceriodaphnia dubia Richard, 1894

Species of small freshwater animal

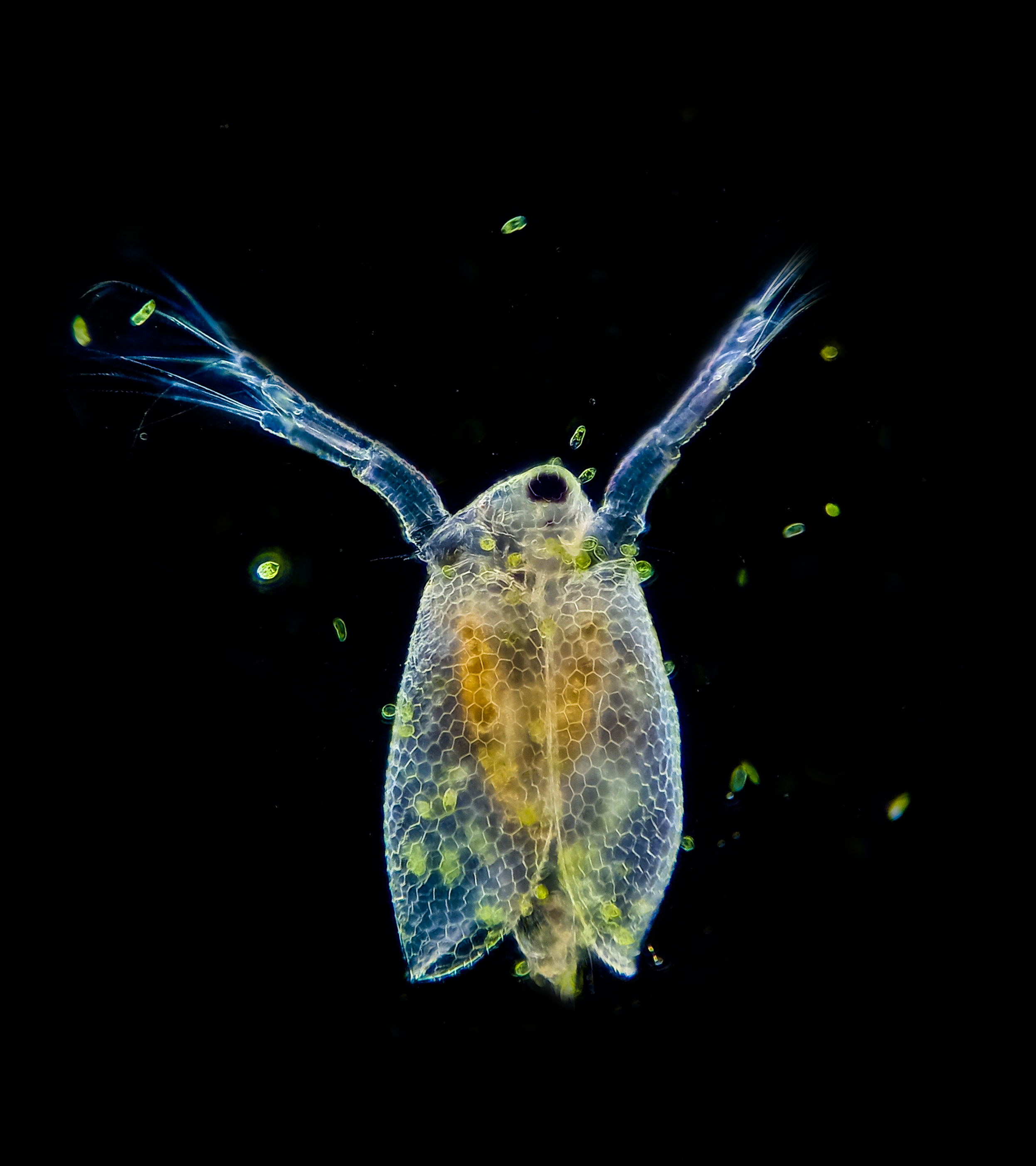
Ceriodaphnia dubia seen with dark field, ventral view, focus tracking, 400x magnification.

Ceriodaphnia dubia is a species of water flea in the class Branchiopoda, living in freshwater lakes, ponds, and marshes in most of the world. They are small, generally less than 1 millimetre (0.039 in) in length. Males are smaller than females. C. dubia moves using a powerful set of second antennae, and is used in toxicity testing of wastewater treatment plant effluent water in the United States. Climate change and particularly ultraviolet radiation B may seriously damage C. dubia populations, as they seem to be more sensitive than other cladocerans such as Daphnia pulex or D. pulicaria.
