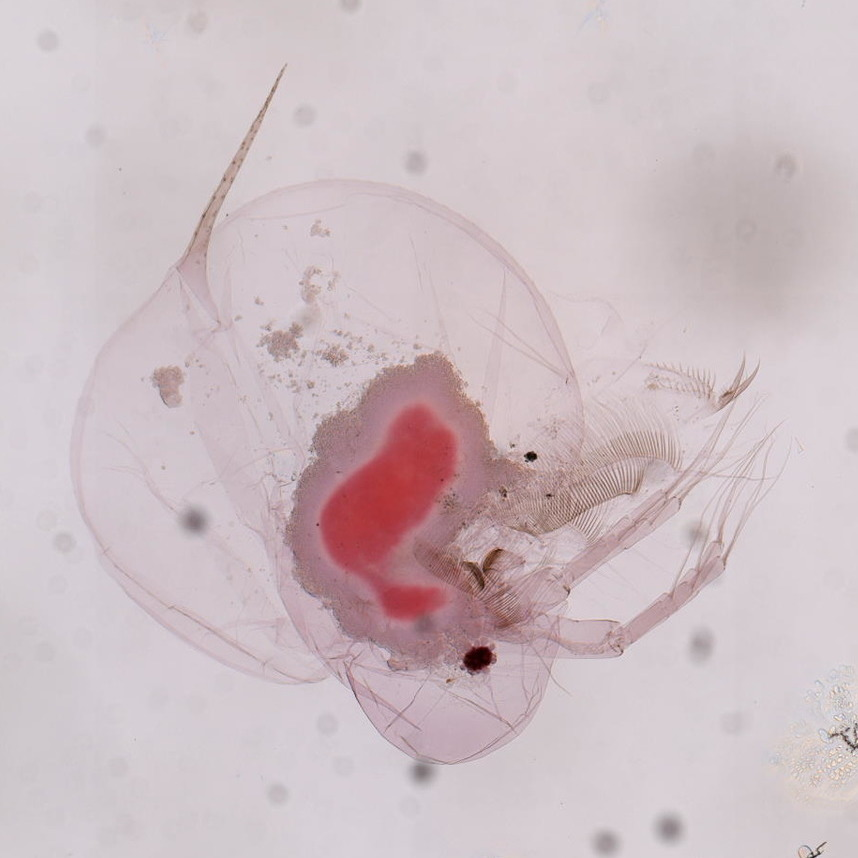

Scientific classification
- Domain: Eukaryota
- Kingdom: Animalia
- Phylum: Arthropoda
- Class: Branchiopoda
- Order: Anomopoda
- Family: Daphniidae
- Genus: Daphnia
- Species: D. catawba

Binomial name
- Daphnia catawba Coker, 1926

= Daphnia catawba =

Species of crustacean

Daphnia catawba is a species of water flea found in northeastern North America.
