= Moina mongolica =

Scientific classification
- Kingdom: Animalia
- Phylum: Arthropoda
- Clade: Pancrustacea
- Class: Branchiopoda
- Order: Anomopoda
- Family: Moinidae
- Genus: Moina
- Species: M. mongolica

Binomial name
- Moina mongolica Daday, 1901

Species of crustacean

Moina mongolica is a species of crustacean belonging to the family Moinidae.

The species inhabits freshwater environments.
