= Moina belli =

Scientific classification
- Kingdom: Animalia
- Phylum: Arthropoda
- Class: Branchiopoda
- Order: Anomopoda
- Family: Moinidae
- Genus: Moina
- Species: M. belli

Binomial name
- Moina belli Gurney, 1904

Species of small freshwater animal

Moina belli is a species of crustacean within the family Moinidae, described by Robert Gurney in 1904. This species lives in waters containing high salinity and other impurities, such as the Makgadikgadi Pans region of Botswana, where the salinity is extremely high.
