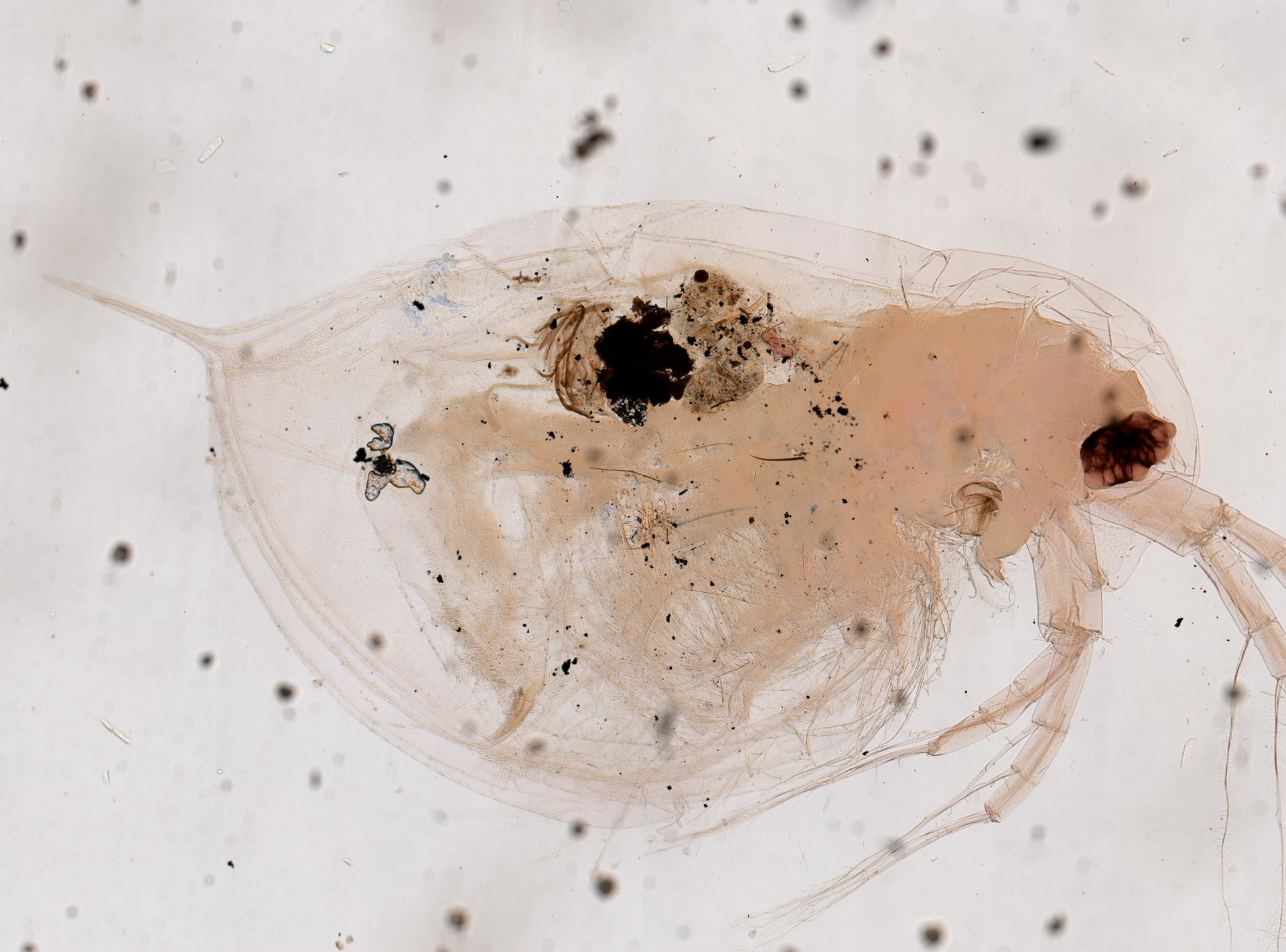
- Daphnia barbata Weltner, 1898

Scientific classification
- Domain: Eukaryota
- Kingdom: Animalia
- Phylum: Arthropoda
- Class: Branchiopoda
- Superorder: Diplostraca
- Order: Anomopoda
- Family: Daphniidae
- Genus: Daphnia
- Species: D. barbata

Binomial name
- Daphnia barbata Weltner, 1898

= Daphnia barbata =

Species of small freshwater animal

Daphnia barbata is a species of water flea within the family Daphniidae. It occurs in several places within Africa including Lake Chad in northwest Africa and in the Makgadikgadi Pan in Botswana.

== See also ==
- Cryptobiosis
