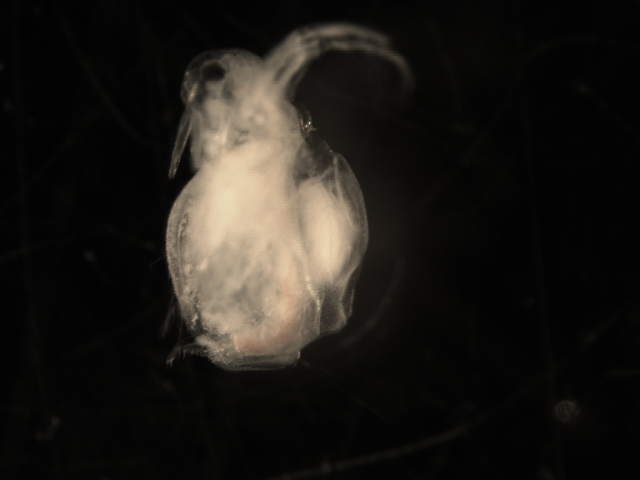

Scientific classification
- Kingdom: Animalia
- Phylum: Arthropoda
- Class: Branchiopoda
- Superorder: Diplostraca
- Order: Anomopoda
- Family: Moinidae
- Genus: Moina; Baird, 1850

Type species
- Moina brachiata (Jurine, 1820)

= Moina =

Genus of small freshwater crustaceans

Moina is a genus of crustacean within the family Moinidae, which are part of the group referred to as water fleas; they are related to the larger-bodied Daphnia species such as Daphnia magna and Daphnia pulex, though not closely. This genus was first described by W. Baird in 1850.

Moina demonstrates the ability to survive in habitats with adverse biological conditions, these being waters containing low oxygen levels and of a high salinity and other impurities; these habitats include salt pans but also eutrophic water bodies. An example of such an extreme habitat is the highly saline Makgadikgadi Pans of Botswana, which support prolific numbers of Moina belli. The genus is also known from bodies of water across Eurasia, where research indicated previously unknown species diversity in Northern Eurasia, including Japan and China; the newly described groups includes a number of phylogroups were discovered from Northern Eurasia, four new Moina species from Japan, and five new lineages in China. According to genetic data, the genus Moina is divided into two genetic lineages: the European-Western Siberian and Eastern Siberian-Far Eastern, with a transitional zone at the Yenisei River basin of Eastern Siberia.

At least four species of Moina are known to have been introduced to non-native waterways.

== Species ==
Moina contains these species:

- Moina affinis Birge, 1893
- Moina australiensis G.O. Sars, 1896
- Moina baringoensis Jenkin, 1934
- Moina baylyi Forró, 1985
- Moina belli Gurney, 1904
- Moina brachiata (Jurine, 1820) (armed waterflea)
- Moina brachycephala Goulden, 1968
- Moina brevicaudata Вär, 1924
- Moina chankensis Uénо, 1939
- Moina diksamensis Van Damme & Dumont, 2008
- Moina dubia Guerne & Richard, 1892
- Moina dumonti Kotov et al., 2005
- Moina elliptica (Аrоrа, 1931)
- Moina ephemeralis Hudec, 1997
- Moina eugeniae Olivier, 1954
- Moina flexuosa G.O. Sars, 1896
- Moina geei Brehm, 1933
- Moina gouldeni Mirabdullaev, 1993
- Moina hartwigi Weltner, 1899
- Moina hutchinsoni Brehm, 1937
- Moina juanae Brehm, 1948
- Moina kazsabi Forró, 1988
- Moina lipini Smirnov, 1976
- Moina longicollis Jurine, 1820
- Moina macrocopa (Straus, 1820) (Japanese waterflea)
- Moina micrura Kurz, 1875
- Moina minuta Hansen, 1899
- Moina mongolica Daday, 1901
- Moina mukhamedievi Mirabdullaev, 1998
- Moina oryzae Hudec, 1987
- Moina pectinata Gauthier, 1954
- Moina propinqua G.O. Sars, 1885
- Moina reticulata (Daday, 1905)
- Moina rostrata McNair, 1980
- Moina ruttneri Brehm, 1938
- Moina salina Daday, 1888
- Moina tenuicornis G.O. Sars, 1896
- Moina weismanni Ishikawa, 1896
- Moina wierzejskii Richard, 1895
