= Daphnia jollyi =

Conservation status
- Vulnerable (IUCN 2.3)

Scientific classification
- Kingdom: Animalia
- Phylum: Arthropoda
- Class: Branchiopoda
- Subclass: Phyllopoda
- Superorder: Diplostraca
- Order: Anomopoda
- Family: Daphniidae
- Genus: Daphnia
- Species: D. jollyi

Binomial name
- Daphnia jollyi Petkovski, 1973

Species of small freshwater animal

Daphnia jollyi is a species of crustaceans in the genus Daphnia. It is endemic to Western Australia, where it lives in shallow freshwater pools over granite bedrock. Daphnia jollyi is listed as a vulnerable species on the IUCN Red List.
