= Daphnia occidentalis =

Conservation status
- Vulnerable (IUCN 2.3)

Scientific classification
- Kingdom: Animalia
- Phylum: Arthropoda
- Class: Branchiopoda
- Order: Anomopoda
- Family: Daphniidae
- Genus: Daphnia
- Subgenus: Australodaphnia; Colbourne et al., 2006
- Species: D. occidentalis

Binomial name
- Daphnia occidentalis Benzie, 1986

Species of small freshwater animal

Daphnia occidentalis is a species of crustacean in the family Daphniidae. It is endemic to Australia, and is the only species in the subgenus Australodaphnia.
