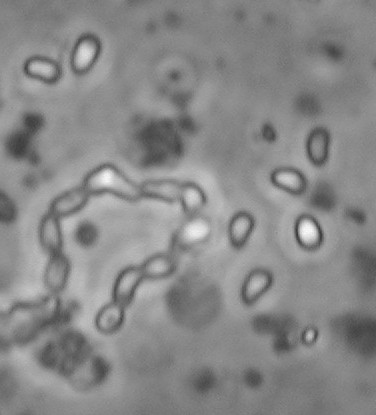
- Ordospora colligata spores (2-3 μm long)

Scientific classification
- Kingdom: Fungi
- Phylum: Microsporidia
- Family: Ordosporidae
- Genus: Ordospora
- Species: O. colligata

Binomial name
- Ordospora colligata Larsson, 1997

= Ordospora colligata =

Intracellular parasite

Ordospora colligata is an intracellular parasite belonging to the Microsporidia. It is an obligatory gut parasite with the crustacean Daphnia magna as its only host. So far it has been reported from Europe and Asia.

The lifecycle of O. colligata consists of two different stages, the merogonial stage with immature spores and the sporogonial stage with mature spores.

== Transmission ==
O. colligata is transmitted horizontally from living hosts. Vertical transmission has not been observed. The spores are released with the faeces and float in the water until a new host ingests them while filter feeding. With this direct waterborne transmission, the parasite easily infects other hosts, so their prevalence is typically high and can reach up to 100% in natural populations.

== Virulence ==
When females of D. magna are infected with O. colligata, their reproductive success is about 20% lower, and the normal lifespan of 60 days is shortened to about 50 days. In comparison with other endoparasites of Daphnia spp., O. colligata is rather avirulent and does not drive infected host populations to extinction. The infections are difficult to detect due to the lack of external signs. The complete development of this intracellular parasite takes place in the gut epithelium. Therefore, the host needs to be dissected and its gut epithelium examined under a phase contrast microscope, to confirm infection. A magnification of 200-400x is necessary for visualizing the spores.

== Life cycle ==
O. colligata lives in epithelial gut cells in a large parasitophorous vacuole, which is formed by the host at the time of infection. The host nucleus is shifted to a more lateral position. The vacuoles are filled with mature spores in the centre and immature presporal stages at the periphery. When these epithelium cells with parasitophorous vacuoles are shed in the gut, the parasite spores leave the host together with the faeces.

All lifecycle stages of the parasite have isolated nuclei and the merogonial (immature) and sporogonial (mature) stages occur together in the vacuole.

=== Merozoites ===
The immature presporal stages, which are called merozoites, have a round or ovoid shape and measure 2.8 μm in diameter. During merogony, small plasmodia with four nuclei are produced and the shape changes to an elongated form with 1.6 μm width. The fact that merogonial and sporogonial stages co-occur suggests the existence of repeated merogonial divisions. The last division of merozoites results in sporonts, but meiosis has not been observed.

In comparison to the merozoites, the sporonts have a less dense cytoplasm. Electron-dense secretions create a thick layer on the surface and tubular material (63-65 nm in diameter) is produced. The earliest sporonts are elongated oval cells with two nuclei and these sporogonial stages occur often pairwise. This pairwise structure leads to the interpretation of two sporoblast mother cells, which have failed to separate during the first division of the sporont. After another nuclear division, each sporoblast mother cell turns into a chain of four sporoblasts. Since the separation of the initial division has failed to complete, the two chains are still connected, leading to chains of eight mature spores. These eight spores are not only externally linked but also via cytoplasmic bridges.

=== Spore morphology ===
Mature spores are pear-shaped, have a pointed anterior pole and contain a vacuole at the posterior end. The size of unfixed spores is 1.33-2.29 x 2.32-3.69 μm. There are three different layers building the spore wall resulting in a thickness of 106-132 nm. The spore wall is significantly thinner at the anterior pole, where also the polar filament is attached to an anchoring disc. The polar filament has a diameter of 150 nm and extends into the centre of the spore for a third of the entire spore length, then turning off laterally in the direction of the spore wall, but ending before it touches the layers of the spore wall.

== Genome ==
O. colligata has 10 chromosomes, and it is estimated to have a total genome size of 3 Mbp. The predicted number of open reading frames is 1820 with a mean gene length of 1041 bp. The gene density is 0.82 genes/kbp.

On chromosome 8 in the low-GC region is a protein located, which has a homology to genes of D. pulex and D. magna. These genes code for the protein septin 7, which is important for the endocytosis-based invasion process of a fungal pathogen. The O. colligata genome has acquired these genes from its Daphnia host by horizontal gene transfer. It is suggested, that the parasite uses the acquired septin to induce its incorporation in a host cell by mimicking host receptors. However, no evidence has been found of the gene retaining its function after the host-to-parasite horizontal gene transfer.

O. colligata, like other Microsporidia, has undergone an extreme reduction in its genome. The reduction has happened before the origin of the present species and with that before their adaption to vertebrate hosts.

In contrast to other Microsporidia, O. colligata is not capable of producing RNA interference.

== Etymology ==
Ordospora is derived from the Latin noun ordo; line of similar specimen and the Latin noun spora; seed.

The specific name colligata is derived from the Latin verb colligo, bind together, which refers to the connected sporoblasts and spores.
