= D. nivalis =

D. nivalis may refer to:

- Daphnia nivalis, a crustacean species
- Draba nivalis, a cruciferous plant species
