= Daphnia coronata =

Conservation status
- Vulnerable (IUCN 2.3)

Scientific classification
- Kingdom: Animalia
- Phylum: Arthropoda
- Class: Branchiopoda
- Subclass: Phyllopoda
- Superorder: Diplostraca
- Order: Anomopoda
- Family: Daphniidae
- Genus: Daphnia
- Species: D. coronata

Binomial name
- Daphnia coronata G. O. Sars, 1916

Species of small freshwater animal

Daphnia coronata is a species of crustaceans in the family Daphniidae. It is endemic to South Africa.
