= Daphnia nivalis =

Conservation status
- Vulnerable (IUCN 2.3)

Scientific classification
- Kingdom: Animalia
- Phylum: Arthropoda
- Class: Branchiopoda
- Subclass: Phyllopoda
- Superorder: Diplostraca
- Order: Anomopoda
- Family: Daphniidae
- Genus: Daphnia
- Species: D. nivalis

Binomial name
- Daphnia nivalis Hebert, 1977

Species of small freshwater animal

Daphnia nivalis is a species of water flea in the family Daphniidae, closely related to Daphnia carinata. It is endemic to the Snowy Mountains of eastern Australia, where it lives only in water bodies that have existed for less than 20,000 years, including Lake Cootapatamba, Australia's highest lake. Due to its restricted range, it is listed as a vulnerable species on the IUCN Red List.
