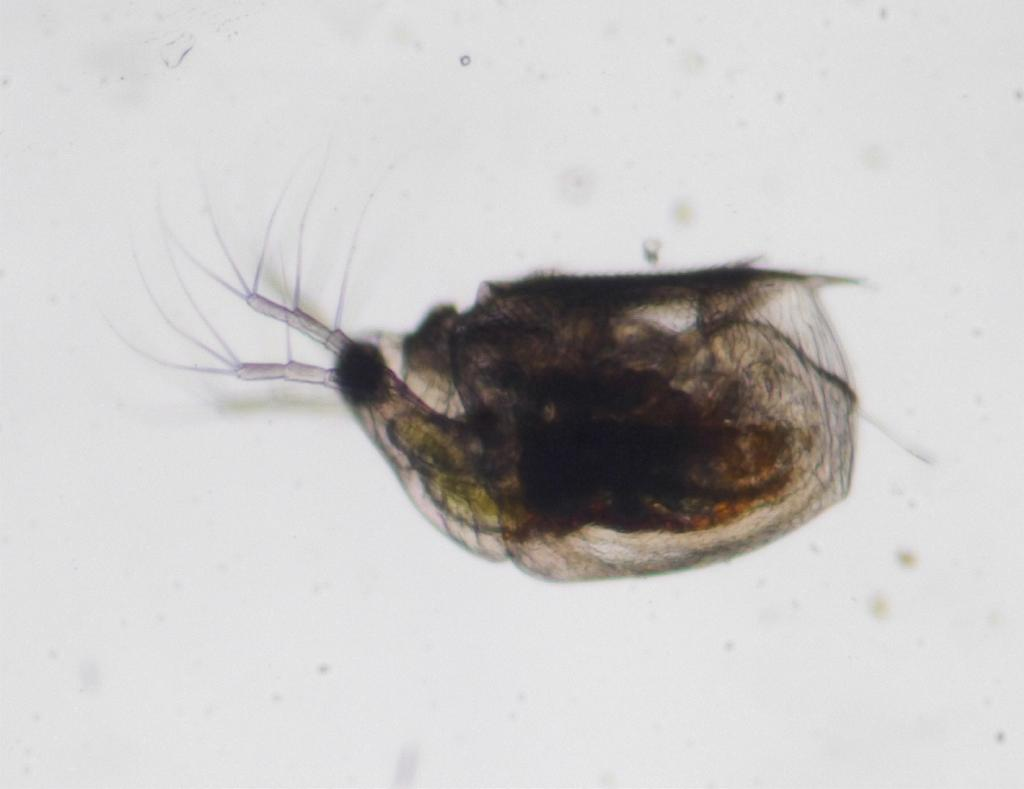
- Scapholeberis sp., Japan

Scientific classification
- Kingdom: Animalia
- Phylum: Arthropoda
- Clade: Pancrustacea
- Class: Branchiopoda
- Order: Anomopoda
- Family: Daphniidae
- Genus: Scapholeberis; Schoedler, 1858

Species
- See text

= Scapholeberis =

Genus of small freshwater animals

Scapholeberis is a genus of small freshwater crustaceans in the family Daphniidae. The genus was described in 1858 by Schoedler and its members have a cosmopolitan distribution.

== Species ==
The genus includes the following species:

- Scapholeberis armata Herrick, 1882
- Scapholeberis duranguensis Quiroz-Vázquez & Elías-Gutiérrez, 2009
- Scapholeberis erinaceus Daday, 1903
- Scapholeberis mucronata O.F. Mueller, 1776
