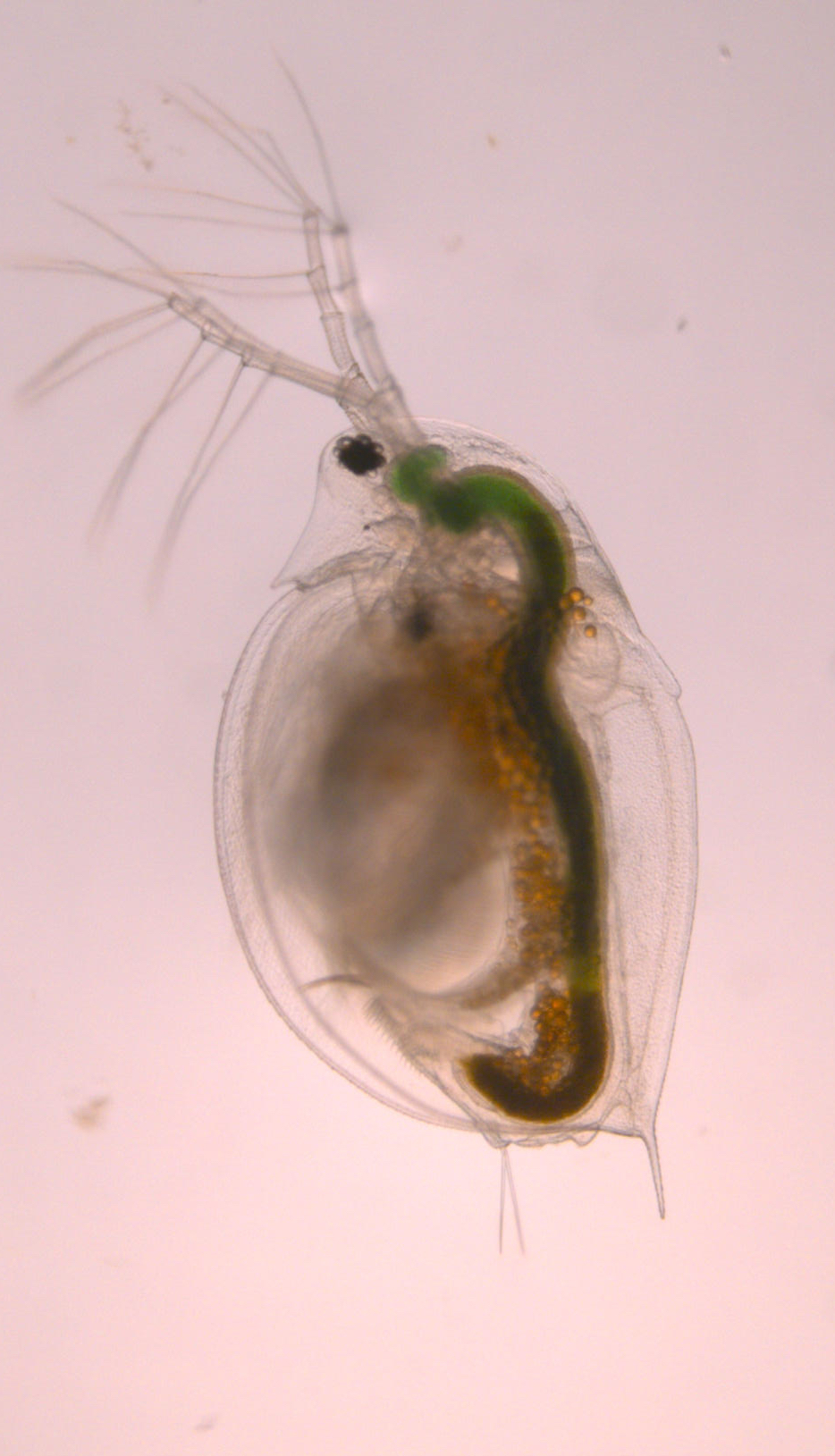

Scientific classification
- Kingdom: Animalia
- Phylum: Arthropoda
- Clade: Pancrustacea
- Class: Branchiopoda
- Order: Anomopoda
- Family: Daphniidae
- Genus: Daphnia
- Subgenus: Daphnia
- Species: D. pulicaria

Binomial name
- Daphnia pulicaria Forbes, 1893

= Daphnia pulicaria =

Species of freshwater crustacean known as "water fleas"

Daphnia pulicaria is a species of planktonic freshwater crustacean belonging to the genus Daphnia. They are commonly known as "water fleas," a name which attributes the swimming behaviors of Daphnia to jumping through the water, as terrestrial fleas do in air. Crustaceans of the Daphnia genus, of which there are over 100 species, are categorized under the Branchiopoda class, which is defined by the presence of legs that are fringed like leaves. Species of Daphnia such as D. pulicaria are keystone species in their freshwater ecosystems due to their influence on food webs, mainly connecting energy flow from primary producers like algae to higher trophic levels like the fish that feed on them. They are also unique in their body composition being high in phosphorus and low in nitrogen which can help suppress cyanobacterial blooms and nitrogen fixation. of D. pulicaria are specifically known to inhabit freshwater ecosystems such as ponds and lakes in North America and Europe. Species of the Daphnia genus, including D. pulicaria, are well-studied model organisms because they are easy to breed, maintain, and observe in laboratories. D. pulicaria are closely related to Daphnia pulex, and numerous studies have investigated the nature and strength of this relationship because these species can produce Daphnia pulex-pulicaria hybrids. In recent years, D. pulicaria along with other Daphnia species have been negatively affected by invasive predators, such as Bythotrephes longimanus.

== Description ==
D. pulicaria are small crustaceans that typically do not exceed 3.5 mm in length. They have mostly transparent bodies that may change colors with changes in diet and environment. For example, a diet of green algae will confer a transparent body with a yellow-green coloration, while a diet of bacteria confers a white or pinkish coloration. Like all Daphnia, they possess two antennae, a singular compound eye, a carapace, an abdomen, and a tail-like appendage called an apical spine or spina. Daphnia are generally found in environments of standing freshwater such as ponds (whether temporary or permanent) and lakes. They are not found in flowing freshwater like streams or rivers, or extreme conditions such as hot springs. D. pulicaria are known to prefer lakes and permanent ponds with large surface areas, in comparison with other species of Daphnia like its close relative, D. pulex, which prefer shallow bodies of standing water. D. pulicaria are found throughout such lakes and ponds in North America and Europe, usually swimming in open water. They are known as filter feeders. They feed on food particles such as algae drifting in the waters they inhabit. They are able to reproduce both asexually and sexually, and they alternate between the two systems in a cyclical pattern called cyclical parthenogenesis depending on environmental conditions.

== Morphology and physiology ==
Daphnia typically span lengths between 0.5 mm - 5 mm, while the species Daphnia pulicaria typically do not exceed 3.5 mm in length. They possess two large antennae near their eye that help them with movement through the water. Between these large antennae is their singular compound eye, which forms via the fusion of two eye spots during development. The transparent bodies of Daphnia are protected by a carapace, or a double-walled, uncalcified shell made of a polysaccharide material called chitin. This protects the internal organs of Daphnia. They have many small legs and mandibles used to assist in filtering water, feeding, and respiring. Below the carapace region, Daphnia have an abdominal region containing more organs with two claws on the end. They also have a tail-like appendage beneath the abdomen called the apical spine or spina that may assist the organisms with defense or hydrodynamics.

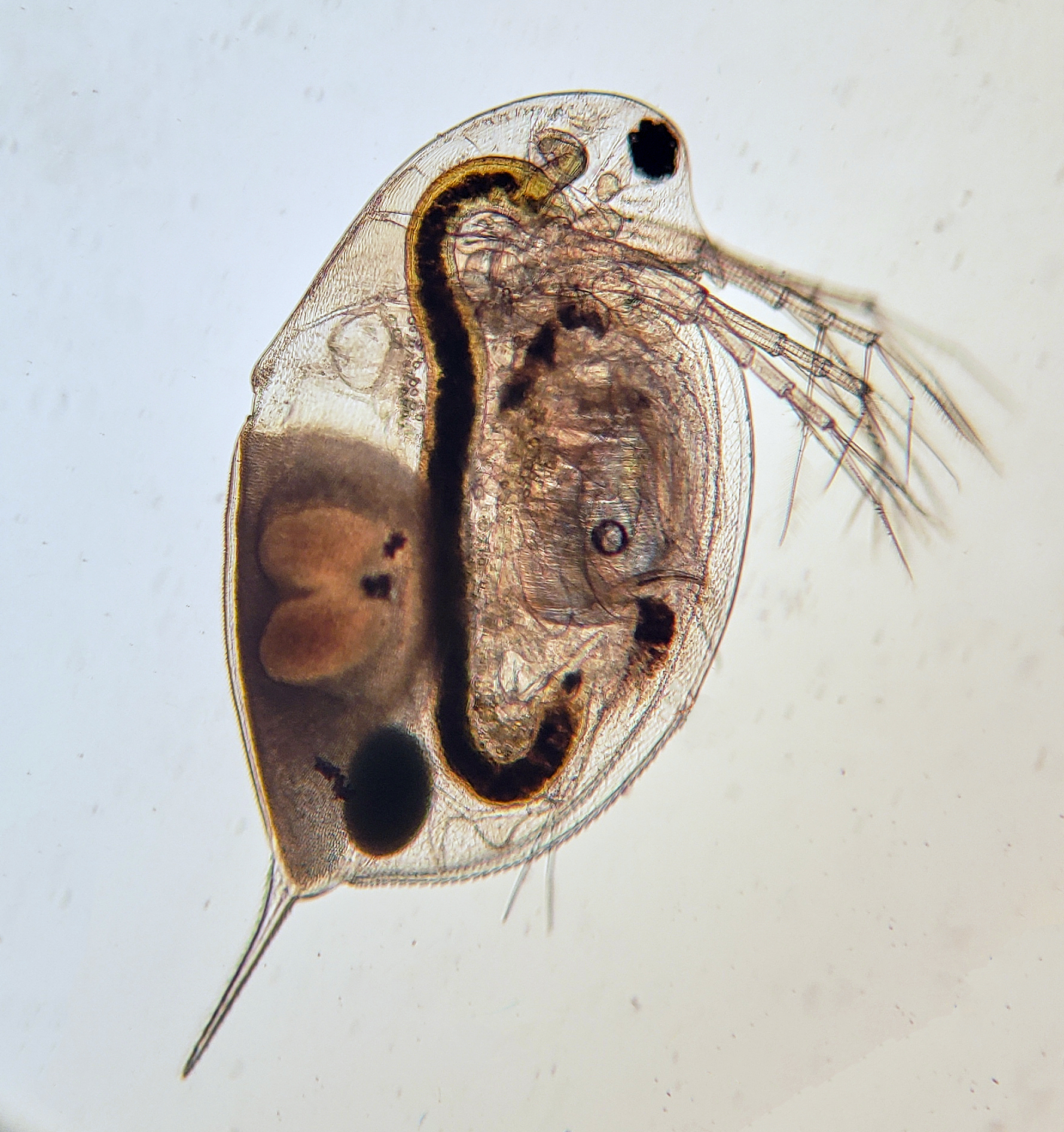

=== Digestive tract ===
The digestive tract of Daphnia is visible through the animals' transparent bodies, and is divided into the esophagus, the midgut, and the hindgut. Peristaltic contractions, are responsible for the movement of food along the tract.

=== Heart and Circulatory System ===
Daphnia possess hearts that pump hemolymph (a circulatory fluid combining the functions of the blood and lymph system through an open circulation system. The heart rate of Daphnia is dependent on temperature, where colder conditions give rise to slower heart rate. Like many organisms, Daphnia uses a hemoglobin protein to transport oxygen through its circulatory system. Both food uptake and hemolymph oxygen levels are able to modulate the coloration of these organisms.

=== Eyes ===
The large eyes of Daphnia also serve a large physiological purpose, at the cost of being a conspicuous signal for predator recognition. Thus selective pressure should reward smaller eyes which are less conspicuous to predators, unless the functional capabilities of these eyes pose benefits. Daphnia use their eyes to sense and avoid predators in the vicinity using visual tracking and an optomotor response, conferring a necessity for large eyes. They are able to visually track motion in their surrounding environments in this optomotor response, employing eye movements controlled by muscles in the eye stalk. Their eyes are also able to fixate on light sources, and follow both horizontal and vertical movements of the organism as they swim through water, to integrate positioning.

== Habitat and life history ==
As mentioned above, Daphnia find habitats in standing freshwater environments, and are typically found swimming in open waters, feeding on food particles drifting through the water. Daphnia do not tend to inhabit flowing freshwater like rivers or streams, nor extreme environments like hot springs. D. pulicaria are the dominant taxon of Daphnia across the North American continent, and can be found in the Northern Hemisphere, particularly North America and Europe. D. pulicaria prefer to inhabit permanent environments such as deep lakes and ponds with large surface areas. This differs in comparison to their close relatives, D. pulex, which tend to prefer smaller or even temporary ponds, which provide less environmental stability and permanence. The salinity of D. pulicaria's environment is negatively correlated with their survival, fecundity, and growth. In addition, high temperatures in their environments is linked to mortality. Heat waves and changes in salinity have become more common in freshwater ecosystems due to global warming, posing a threat to the environments of D. pulicaria, which effects their survival and success. Changes in the environment also confer selection in D. pulicaria clones, such as the composition of clones and their vertical migrations. This may be due to changes in habitat availability and competition among Daphnia that come with changes in season. The populations of D. pulicaria in the Great Lakes in the United States have been negatively affected by the invasive species Bythotrephes longimanus. This invasive predator of D. pulicaria has also contributed to a decline of other zooplankton species in the Great Lakes.

== Behavior ==
=== Feeding ===
Daphnia are considered to be filter feeders due to their tendency to feed on food particles drifting in their aqueous environments. They scavenge for food using their leaf-like legs to produce water currents, which direct food particles toward their specialized food grooves. Setae (stiff bristle-like structures) are used to collect the food particles into the food grooves. Then their mandibles are used for mechanical food breakdown, before food enters the digestive tract. The main food of Daphnia is planktonic algae, though they can also collect and eat bacteria and phytoplankton depending on what is available.

=== Swimming ===
Daphnia swim in a "jumping" pattern, where the down beating of their antennae causes rapid upward movements in the water, followed by a lack of movement which causes daphnia to sink due to the high density of their bodies. This behavior is the reason behind their common name, "water fleas," due to the resemblance to terrestrial fleas' jumping pattern. Light levels, food levels, the presence or absence of predators, and temperature are all variables that dictate Daphnia swimming behaviors. D. pulicaria undergo vertical migrations to span different depths and temperatures of lake waters called diel vertical migrations or DVM. As determined in the laboratory, in wintry temperatures, D. pulicaria swim mainly vertically, which is explained by increasing the probability that they will encounter food particles. In summery temperatures, the swimming behaviors or D. pulicaria are dependent on light levels. Under daylight, D. pulicaria swim in mainly vertical directions to scavenge for food. Under nightlight, they will swim in horizontal directions, supposedly to feed on phytoplankton present in warmer nighttime conditions. Given the preference of D. pulicaria to inhabit deep standing freshwater in the Northern hemisphere, adaptations with respect to temperature and season are necessary, considering the stratification of lake temperatures due to depth change and the seasonal variations in outside temperature in these regions, respectively.

The swimming behaviors of D. pulicaria also vary according to the seasonal temperature and depth of their environment. The body length of individual D. pulicaria organisms may also contribute to differences in swimming behaviors. Swimming behaviors that may be affected include turning angle, swimming speed, and sinking rate of the speeds. While predictions may expect D. pulicaria to have the slowest sinking speed during winter months (due to a lower water temperatures and high water viscosity), studies found that the sinking speeds of Daphnia were not determined by water viscosity. Rather, D. pulicaria had the slowest sinking speed in the summer months, when water temperature was higher and thus viscosity was lower. Interestingly, turning angle and sinking rate during swimming was not modulated by differences in food concentrations in the waters of D. pulicaria when tested in the laboratory.

=== Predator avoidance ===
D. pulicaria are known to employ DVM (diel vertical migration) not only in response to food and light levels, but also the presence of predators. The main predators of D. pulicaria are fish whose diets include species of plankton. As mentioned in the Morphology and Physiology section, Daphnia have highly functional eyes which are able to employ an optomotor response to track their predators within their vicinity. They use this visual feedback to recognize when predators are nearby, and behave accordingly by DVM. They migrate to deeper, colder waters in the stratification of their deep lake habitats, to depths where they are less likely to be encountered by predators.

== Reproduction and life cycle ==
=== Reproduction ===
Daphnia employ a unique breeding system where, depending on the species and environment, they may exhibit a combination of sexual and asexual reproduction. D. pulicaria show regional and local variations in their breeding systems. They are known to exhibit both breeding systems seen in Daphnia; obligate and cyclic parthenogenesis. Obligate Parthenogenesis describes the system where D. pulicaria reproduce exclusively asexually, giving rise to clones, which is favored during poor conditions. Cyclic parthenogenesis is the breeding system by which D. pulicaria will cycle between asexually producing clones and engaging in sexual reproduction to give rise to offspring with more genetic variability. This system, in contrast, occurs when there are good environmental conditions in the habitats of D. pulicaria. In addition, number of offspring produced through asexual reproduction is heavily influenced by the environmental conditions experienced by an individual. For instance, females in a high-food environment with a longer photoperiod tend to have more offspring. Environmental cues, such as food level, photoperiod, and temperature, significantly influence the reproduction of D. pulicaria. As aforementioned, D. pulicaria prefer to inhabit larger, deeper, more permanent bodies of standing freshwater, such as lakes instead of ponds. The two reproductive systems can be variable among these different habitats; pond populations have been observed to be dominated by obligate parthenogenesis, while lake populations have been observed to reproduce mainly by cyclic parthenogenesis.

=== Life cycle ===
D. pulicaria have a relatively long lifespan of 60–65 days, and adult females might produce offspring every three to four days. Daphnia have two types of eggs, some being normal eggs that develop and hatch immediately, and some being diapausing eggs that have a dormant period and do not develop directly. The normal eggs are diploid clones produced via the asexual breeding system, while the diapausing eggs are haploid eggs to be fertilized by males in the sexual breeding system. The eggs of Daphnia are housed in a brood chamber, which is located between the carapace and the abdomen on the dorsal side of the organism's body. Further, the resting or diapausing eggs are encapsulated in a structure called the ephippium, which sheds from the female Daphnia when she molts, taking the dormant eggs with it. A mature female Daphnia can produce parthenogenetic daughters or sons, or they can produce resting haploid eggs to be internally fertilized by male Daphnia. These haploid eggs may remain dormant during unfavorable seasons and hatch in response to good environmental conditions, bearing only female Daphnia. As discussed in the Reproduction section, the breeding system of Daphnia and specifically D. pulicaria will depend on environmental conditions, but cyclic parthenogenesis is more favorable because it gives rise to more genetic diversity in the population.

=== Hybrids ===
Daphnia pulex is another species within the Daphnia genus that may inhabit similar environments to D. pulicaria. Although D. pulex prefer smaller, shallow, and even temporary ponds for their habitats, they occasionally inhabit the same waters as D. pulicaria. In these cases, mating between the two species gives rise to hybrids between D. pulicaria and D. pulex. These hybrids can be found in a range of habitats, including the shallow ponds preferred by D. pulex and the deeper lakes preferred by D. pulicaria. However, the hybrids are typically observed in locations uninhabited by either parent species. These D. pulicaria-D. pulex hybrids introduce complexities in studying Daphnia due to their similar appearances; they are easily confused with their parent species.

== Closely related species ==
D. pulicaria are considered to be part of the Daphnia pulex species complex and can produce hybrids with D. pulex. While it is difficult to distinguish between these two species using morphological traits, D. pulicaria and D. pulex have significant genomic differences. Phylogenetic studies, using mitochondrial DNA analysis, have identified genetic divergence between D. pulicaria and D. pulex. For instance, variations in the Lactate dehydrogenase gene can help identify D. pulicaria from others in the D. pulex species complex.

== Model organisms ==
Species of Daphnia, including D. pulicaria, are commonly used as model organism for studying life-history traits and phenotypic plasticity. For example, D. pulicaria can detect and respond to kairomones produced by predatory fish. Their sensitivity to environmental cues contributes to the observed seasonal trends in population sizes of D. pulicaria. Moreover, because D. pulicaria reproduce using cyclic parthenogenesis, they are ideal models for genetic studies, including ones concerning spontaneous mutations. They are also highly sensitive to pollutants and are well characterized with a map of both their nuclear and mitochondrial genome which makes them model organisms to measure environmental stress.

== See also ==
- Daphniidae
- Daphnia
- Daphnia pulex
- Daphnia magna
