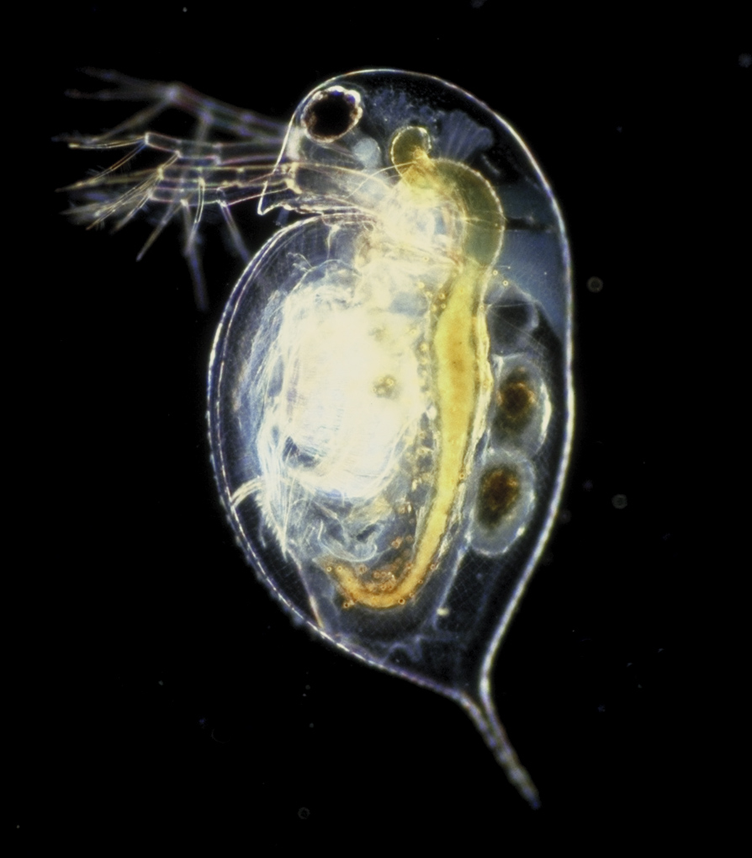
- Daphnia pulex

Scientific classification
- Kingdom: Animalia
- Phylum: Arthropoda
- Clade: Pancrustacea
- Class: Branchiopoda
- Subclass: Phyllopoda
- Superorder: Diplostraca
- Order: Anomopoda
- Family: Daphniidae
- Genus: Daphnia; Müller, 1785

Subgenera
- Australodaphnia (Colbourne et al., 2006); Ctenodaphnia (Dybowski & Grochowski, 1895); Daphnia (O. F. Müller, 1785)

Diversity
- > 200 spp.

Synonyms
- Cephaloxus (Sars, 1861); Dactylura (Brady, 1898); Daphniopsis (Sars, 1903); Hyalodaphnia (Schoedler, 1866); Leiodaphnia (Dybowski & Grochowski, 1895)

= Daphnia =

Daphnia Temporal range: Cretaceous–Recent

Genus of crustaceans

Daphnia is a genus of small planktonic crustaceans, 0.2–6.0 mm (0.01–0.24 in) in length. Daphnia are members of the order Anomopoda, and are one of the several small aquatic crustaceans commonly called water fleas because their saltatory swimming style resembles the movements of fleas. Daphnia spp. live in various aquatic environments ranging from acidic swamps to freshwater lakes and ponds.

The two most commonly found species of Daphnia are D. pulex (small and most common) and D. magna (large). They are often associated with a related genus in the order Cladocera: Moina, which is in the Moinidae group instead of the Daphniidae, and is much smaller than D. pulex (roughly half the maximum length). Another common species of Daphnia is D. pulicaria, often confused with D. pulex due to their similar appearances and ability to produce hybrids.

== Appearance and characteristics ==
The beating heart of Daphnia under the microscope

The body of a Daphnia species is usually 1–5 mm (0.039–0.197 in) long, and is divided into segments, although this division is not visible. The head is fused, and is generally bent down towards the body with a visible notch separating the two. In most species, the rest of the body is covered by a carapace, with a ventral gap in which the five or six pairs of legs lie. The most prominent features are the compound eyes, the second antennae, and a pair of abdominal setae. In many species, the carapace is translucent or nearly so, so they make excellent subjects for the microscope, as one can observe the beating heart.

Even under relatively low-power microscopy, the feeding mechanism can be observed, with immature young moving in the brood pouch; moreover, the eye being moved by the ciliary muscles can be seen, as well as blood cells being pumped around the circulatory system by the simple heart. The heart is at the top of the back, just behind the head, and the average heart rate is about 180 bpm under normal conditions. Daphnia spp., like many animals, are prone to alcohol intoxication as well as caffeine effects, which makes them excellent subjects for studying the effects of the depressant and stimulants on the nervous system due to the translucent exoskeleton and the visibly altered heart rate. They are tolerant of being observed live under a coverslip and appear to suffer no harm when returned to open water. This experiment can also be performed using nicotine, or adrenaline, each producing an increase in the heart rate.

Due to its intermediate size, Daphnia spp. use both diffusion and circulatory methods, producing hemoglobin in low-oxygen environments.

== Systematics and evolution ==
Daphnia is a large genus – comprising over 200 species – belonging to the cladoceran family Daphniidae. It is subdivided into several subgenera (Daphnia, Australodaphnia, Ctenodaphnia), but the division has been controversial and is still in development. Each subgenus has been further divided into a number of species complexes. The understanding of species boundaries has been hindered by phenotypic plasticity, hybridization, intercontinental introductions, and poor taxonomic descriptions. Modern members of Daphnia belonging to the subgenera Daphnia and Ctenodaphnia are known since the Cretaceous, though the genus likely originated prior to the beginning of the Cretaceous. There are numerous poorly studied and cryptic species among crustaceans of the genus Daphnia.

== Ecology and behaviour ==
Daphnia species are normally r-selected, meaning that they invest in early reproduction, so have short lifespans. An individual Daphnia lifespan depends on factors such as temperature and the abundance of predators, but can be 13–14 months in some cold, oligotrophic, fish-free lakes. In typical conditions, however, the lifecycle is much shorter, not usually exceeding 5–6 months.

Daphnia spp. are typically filter feeders, ingesting mainly unicellular algae and various sorts of organic detritus including protists and bacteria. Beating of the legs produces a constant current through the carapace, which brings such material into the digestive tract. The trapped food particles are formed into a food bolus which then moves down the digestive tract until voided through the anus located on the ventral surface of the terminal appendage. The second and third pairs of legs are used in the organisms' filter-feeding, ensuring large, unabsorbable particles are kept out, while the other sets of legs create the stream of water rushing into the organism.

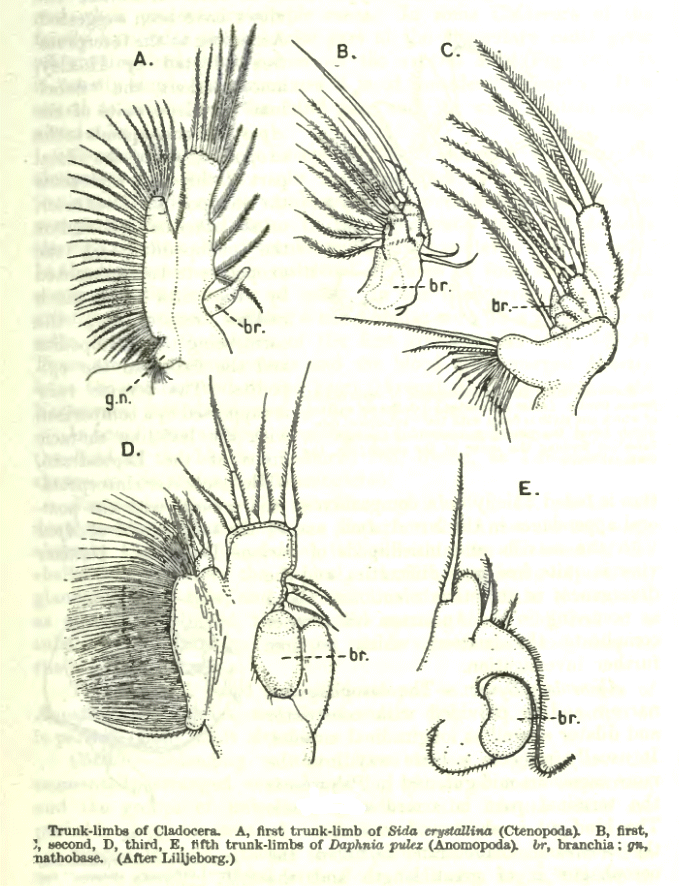
The five trunk limbs, used in filter feeding

Swimming is powered mainly by the second set of antennae, which are larger in size than the first set. The action of this second set of antennae is responsible for the jumping motion.

Daphnia spp. are known to show behavioral changes or modifications to their morphology in the presence of predator kairomones (chemical signals), including larger size at hatching, increased bulkiness, and the development of "neck-teeth". For example, juveniles of D. pulex and D. magna have a larger size after hatching, along with developing neck-teeth at the back of the head, when in the presence of Chaoborus kairomones. These morphological defenses have shown to reduce mortality due to Chaoborus predation, which is a gape-limited predator. Chitin-related genes (deacetylases) are thought to play an important part in the expression/development of these morphological defenses in Daphnia. Chitin-modifying enzymes (chitin deacetylases) have been shown to catalyse the N-deacetylation of chitin to influence the protein-binding affinity of these chitin filaments. In case of D. magna it was shown that the response to different kairomones also differ: While the presence of fish kairomones up-regulated one specific gene in the folding of proteins, whereas Chaoborus kairomone down-regulated the same gene. Based on this the response is a reduction of size at first reproduction in response to kairomones from fish whereas it shows increased size when confronted with larvae of Chaoborus. With the same publication it was shown that genes for glyceraldehyde 3-phosphate dehydrogenase and ubiquitin conjugating enzyme were up-regulated in the presence of microcystins in the food of D. magna and with this the enzymes of glycolysis and protein catabolism are significantly upgregulated when daphnids ingest these toxins.

== Life cycle ==
Most Daphnia species have a lifecycle based on "cyclical parthenogenesis", alternating between parthenogenetic (asexual) and sexual reproduction. For most of the growth season, females reproduce asexually. They produce a brood of diploid eggs every time they molt; these broods can contain as few as one or two eggs in smaller species, such as D. cucullata, but can be over 100 in larger species, such as D. magna. Under typical conditions, these eggs hatch after a day, and remain in the female's brood pouch for around three days (at 20 °C). They are then released into the water, and pass through a further four to six instars over 5–10 days (longer in poor conditions) before reaching an age where they are able to reproduce. The asexually produced offspring are typically female.

Cyclic parthenogenesis in the cladoceran Daphnia magna

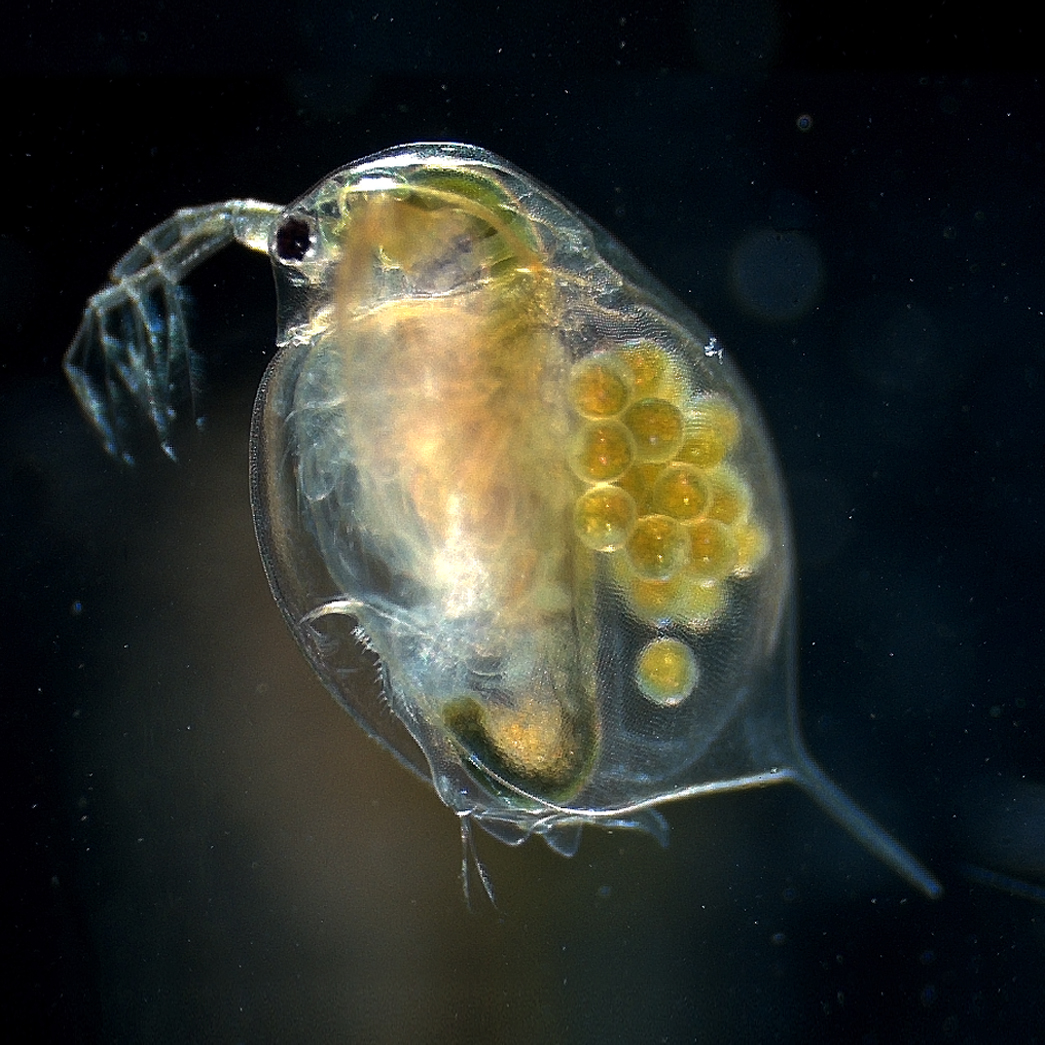
Female Daphnia with eggs

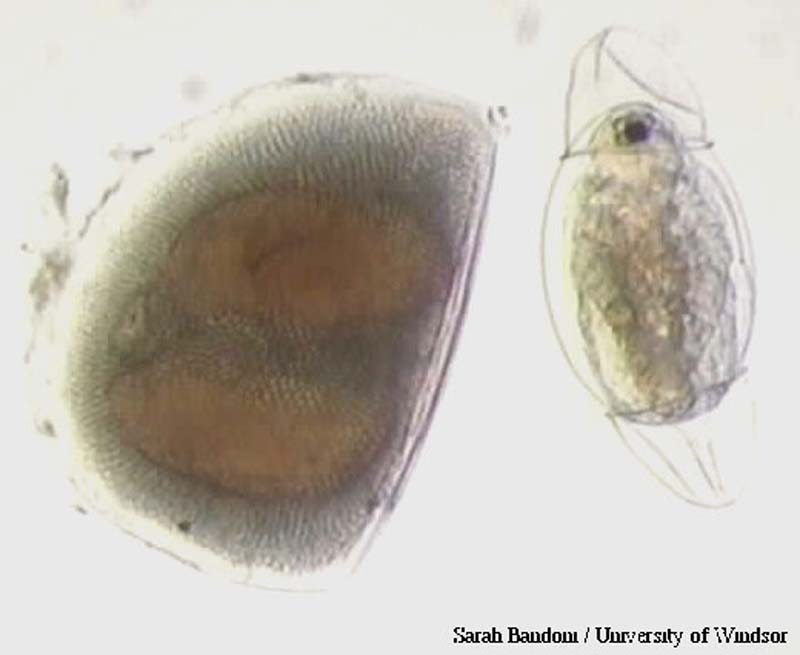
Resting egg pouch (ephippium) and the juvenile daphnid that just has hatched from it

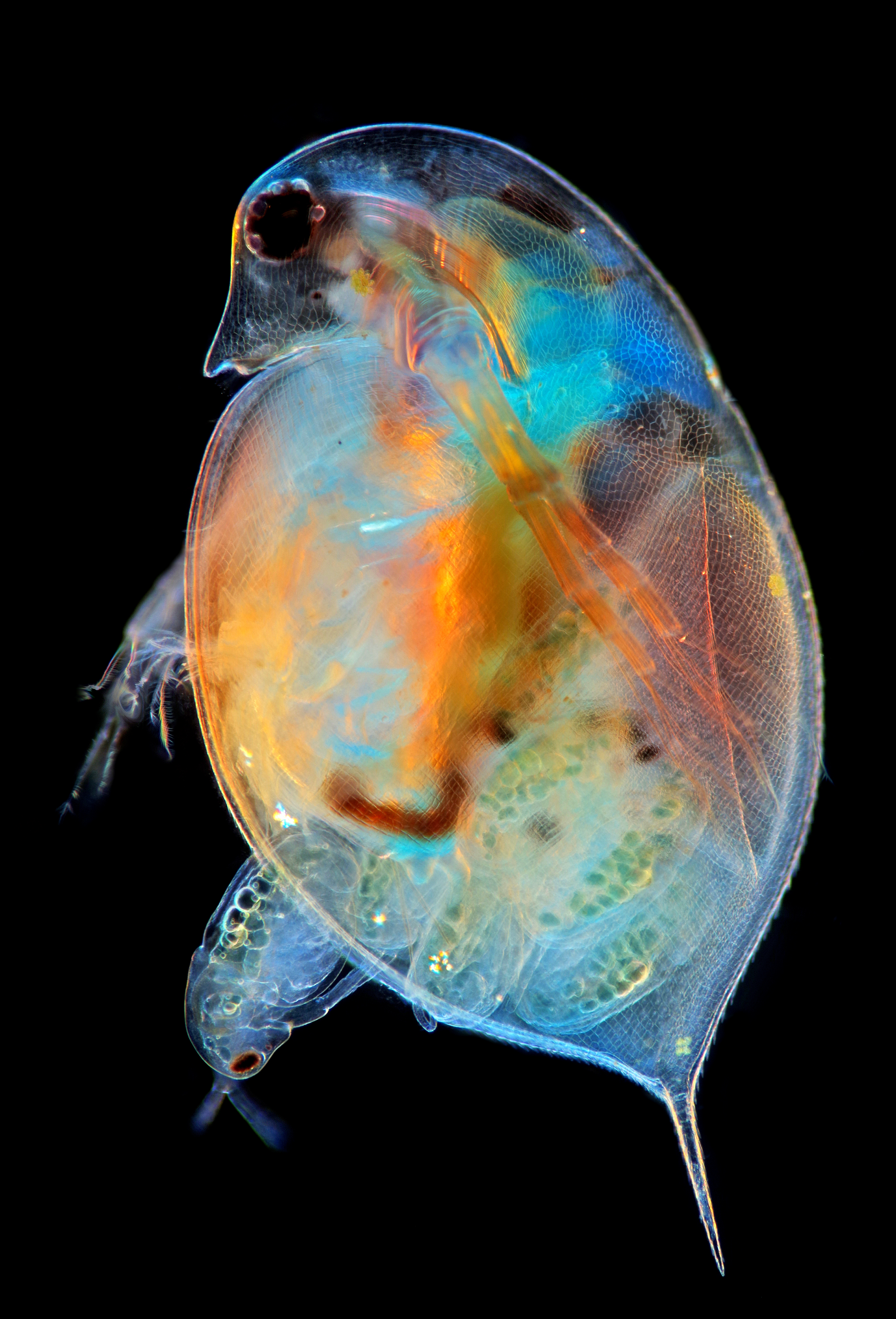
Daphnia giving birth

Towards the end of the growing season, however, the mode of reproduction changes, and the females produce tough "resting eggs" or "winter eggs". When environmental conditions deteriorate (e.g. crowding), some of the asexually produced offspring develop into males. The females start producing haploid sexual eggs, which the males fertilise. In species without males, resting eggs are also produced asexually and are diploid. In either case, the resting eggs are protected by a hardened coat (consisting of two chitinous plates) called the ephippium, and are cast off at the female's next molt. The ephippia can withstand periods of extreme cold, drought, or poor food availability, and hatch – when conditions improve – into females (They are close to being classed as extremophiles) .

== Parasites ==
Life cycle of Pasteuria ramosa, a bacterial parasite of the cladoceran Daphnia magna.

The diagram on the left shows the lifecycle of Pasteuria ramosa, a bacterial parasite of Daphnia. Susceptible hosts acquire the infection from spores in the sediment or in suspension. The parasite develops mainly in the host's body cavity and muscle tissue, increasing in density and eventually expanding to occupy the entire host. Typical effects on the host are sterility and gigantism. Spores are released mainly after the host dies and sinks to the substrate, and sometimes directly to the water via clumsy predation.

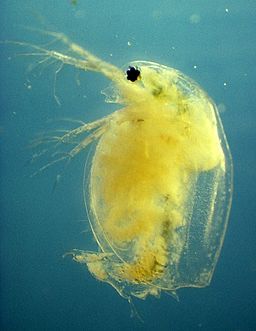
D. magna infected with Pasteuria ramosa

== Conservation ==
Several Daphnia species are considered threatened. These are listed as vulnerable by IUCN: Daphnia nivalis, Daphnia coronata, Daphnia occidentalis, and Daphnia jollyi. Some species are halophiles, and can be found in hypersaline lake environments, an example of which is the Makgadikgadi Pan.

== Uses ==
Daphnia spp. are a popular live food in tropical and marine fish keeping. They are often fed to tadpoles or small species of amphibians such as the African dwarf frog (Hymenochirus boettgeri).

Daphnia spp. are used in scientific studies as a model organism. They may be used in certain environments to test the effects of toxins on an ecosystem, which makes them an indicator genus, particularly useful because of their short lifespans and reproductive capabilities. Because they are nearly transparent, their internal organs are easy to study in live specimens (e.g. to study the effect of temperature on the heart rate of these ectothermic organisms). Environmental toxicological testing may be undertaken with researchers assessing mortality rates or metabolic perturbations to evaluate ecological impacts. Daphnia is also commonly used for experiments to test climate change aspects, as UVB that seriously damages zooplankton species (e.g. decrease feeding activity, impairment of growth).

Because of their thin membranes, which allow drugs to be absorbed, they are used to monitor the effects of certain drugs, such as adrenaline or capsaicin, on the heart.

== Invasive species ==
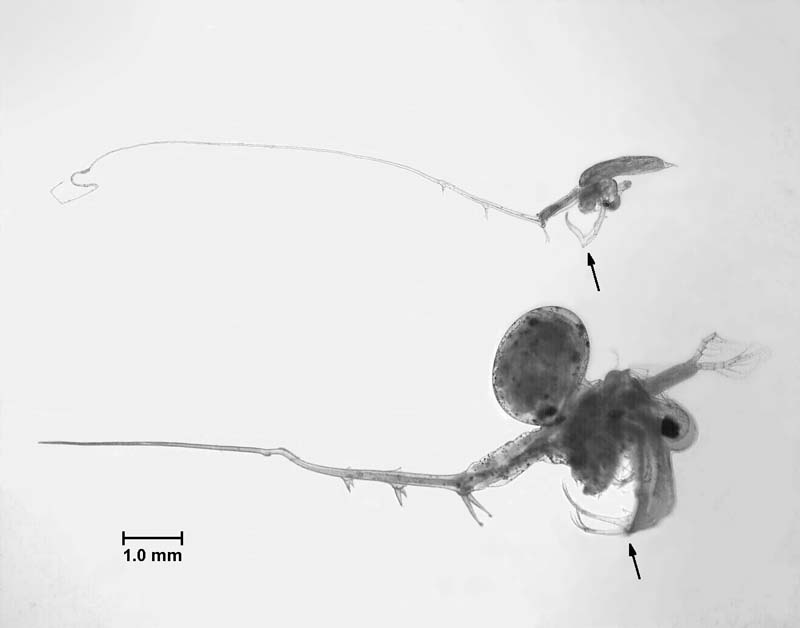
Fishhook waterflea (above) and Bythotrephes longimanus (spiny water flea) (below)

Some species have developed permanent defenses against fish eating them, such as spines and long hooks on the body, which also cause them to become entangled on fishing lines and cloud water with their high numbers. Species such as Daphnia lumholtzi (native to east Africa, the Asian subcontinent of India, and east Australia) have these characteristics and great care should be taken to prevent them from spreading further in North American waters.

Some species of Daphnia native to North America can develop sharp spines at the end of their bodies and helmet-like structures on their heads when they detect predators, but this is overall temporary for such species and they do not completely overwhelm or discourage native predators from eating them. While Daphnia spp. are an important base of the food chain in freshwater lakes (and vernal pools), they become a nuisance when they are unable to be eaten by native macroscopic predators, and some concern exists that the original spineless and hookless water fleas and spp. end up outcompeted by the invasive ones. (This may not be the case, however, and the new invaders may mostly be a tangling and clogging nuisance.)

In the water bodies of the world, at least 15 species of Daphnia and hybrids are non-native species, many of which pose a great threat to aquatic ecosystems.

== See also ==
- List of Daphnia species
- Rotifer
