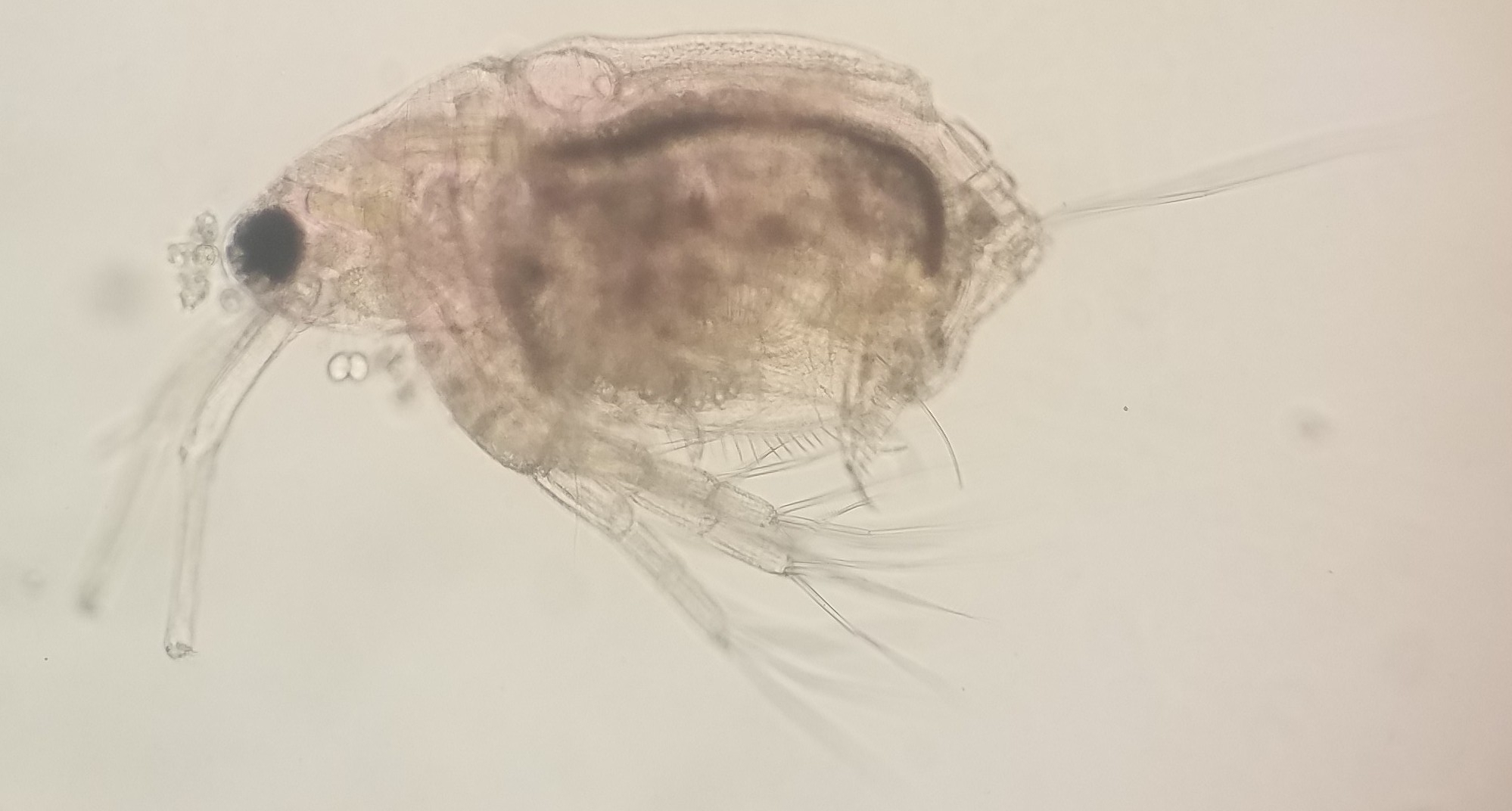

Scientific classification
- Kingdom: Animalia
- Phylum: Arthropoda
- Class: Branchiopoda
- Subclass: Phyllopoda
- Superorder: Diplostraca
- Order: Anomopoda
- Family: Moinidae; Goulden, 1968

= Moinidae =

Family of small freshwater animals

Moinidae is a crustacean family within the order Cladocera. Species within this family are widely occurring, including North America and Africa. In newer classifications, it is sometimes included in the family Daphniidae. Some Moinidae have accidentally been introduced by humans to areas outside of their native range. Genetics study strongly supports division of Moina into two faunistic groups: European-Western Siberian and Eastern Siberian-Far Eastern, with a transitional zone at the Yenisey River basin (Eastern Siberia).

== Genera ==
These two genera belong to the family Moinidae:

- Moina Baird, 1850
- Moinodaphnia Herrick, 1887
