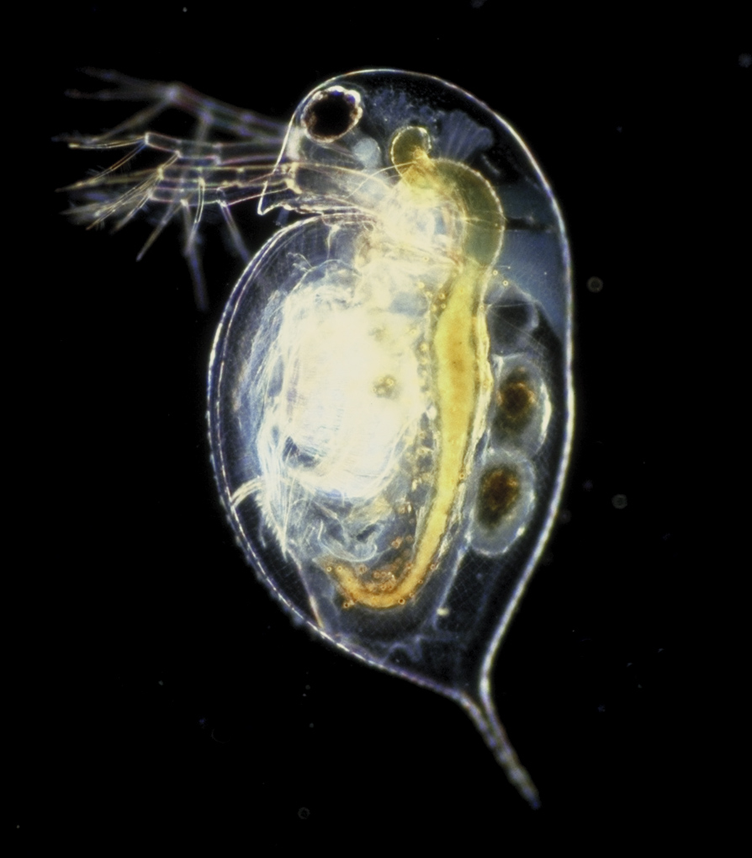

Scientific classification
- Kingdom: Animalia
- Phylum: Arthropoda
- Clade: Pancrustacea
- Class: Branchiopoda
- Order: Anomopoda
- Family: Daphniidae
- Genus: Daphnia
- Subgenus: Daphnia
- Species: D. pulex

Binomial name
- Daphnia pulex Leydig, 1860 (Note: Some sources quote an authority of "Leydig, 1860", or "(De Geer, 1776)".)

= Daphnia pulex =

Species of small freshwater animal

Daphnia pulex is the most common species of water flea. It has a cosmopolitan distribution: the species is found throughout the Americas, Europe, and Australia. It is a model species, and was the first crustacean to have its genome sequenced.

== Description ==
D. pulex is an arthropod whose body segments are difficult to distinguish. It can only be recognised by its appendages (only ever one pair per segment), and by studying its internal anatomy. The head is distinct and is made up of six segments, which are fused together even as an embryo. It bears the mouthparts, and two pairs of antennae, the second pair of which is enlarged into powerful organs used for swimming. No clear division is seen between the thorax and abdomen, which collectively bear five pairs of appendages. The shell surrounding the animal extends posteriorly into a spine. Like most other Daphnia species, D. pulex reproduces by cyclical parthenogenesis, alternating between sexual and asexual reproduction.

== Ecology ==
D. pulex occurs in a wide range of aquatic habitats, although it is most closely associated with small, shaded pools. In oligotrophic lakes, D. pulex has little pigmentation, while it may become bright red in hypereutrophic waters, due to the production of haemoglobin.

=== Predation ===
Daphnia species are prey for a variety of both vertebrate and invertebrate predators. The role of predation on D. pulex population ecology is extensively studied, and has been shown to be a major axis of variation in shaping population dynamics and landscape-level distribution. In addition to the direct population ecological effects of predation, the process contributes to phenotypic evolution in contrasting ways; larger D. pulex individuals are more visible to vertebrate predators, but invertebrate predators are unable to handle larger ones. As a result, larger water fleas tend to be found with invertebrate predators, while smaller size is associated with vertebrate predators.

Similar to some other Daphnia species, the morphology of D. pulex exhibits a plastic response to the presence of predators. Phantom midge larvae (Chaoborus) release kairomones – chemical cues – that induce the development of small, jagged protrusions on the head, known as "neck teeth", which increase survivorship in the presence of the invertebrate predator, but at a cost – longer development time, for example – when those predators are not present.

=== Ecological stoichiometry ===
D. pulex ecology is shaped by nutrient availability and balance, which affects traits that mediate intra- and interspecific interactions. Because nutrients are required for an array of biological processes – for example, amino acid synthesis – the environmental availability of these nutrients regulates downstream organismal characteristics. Low nutrient availability reduces both body size and growth rate, which, as noted above, regulates Daphnia relationships to predators. D. pulex in particular has been an important model species for investigating ecological stoichiometry, demonstrating that pond shading by trees increases nutrient concentrations relative to carbon in algae, which increases D. pulex body size, and therefore competitive ability and susceptibility to predation by vertebrates.

== Genomics ==
D. pulex was the first crustacean to have its genome sequenced. Its genome contains 31,000 genes – 8,000 more than are present in the human genome – as a result of extensive gene duplication.

One of the most astonishing features of the D. pulex genome is its compactness: despite being around 200 megabase pairs (Mbp) in size (around 1/16th of that of the human genome, which is 3,200 Mbp in size); its 12 chromosomes contain a minimum set of 30,907 predicted protein-coding genes, more than the 20,000–25,000 contained in the human counterpart.

Such an efficient gene packaging is achieved by means of a small intron size. Indeed, whereas the mean protein length in D. pulex is quite similar to that of Drosophila, the average gene size is 1000 bp shorter in D. pulex. As inferred from expressed sequence tag analysis, the average intron size found in D. pulex genes is 170 bp.

The intron density of the D. pulex genome, though, is similar to that of Apis mellifera, which in turn is twice that found in Drosophila.

The D. pulex genome has undergone extensive gene duplication followed by rapid paralog divergence and tandem rearrangement. As a result of these processes, around 20% of its gene catalog is composed of tandems consisting of three to 80 paralog genes, many of which are ecoresponsive, that is, they are expressed differently upon exposure of D. pulex to environmental challenges such as biotic or abiotic stress or fluctuations in light or oxygen levels.

== Parthenogenesis ==
D. pulex can reproduce by cyclical parthenogenesis or obligate parthenogenesis. During cyclical parthenogenesis D. pulex cycles between a sexual stage and a parthenogenetic stage. During the sexual stage females produce haploid eggs by meiosis, and these eggs require fertilization by a male to develop further. During the parthenogenetic stage, eggs are produced that do not require fertilization to develop further. The lineages of D. pulex that reproduce by obligate parthenogenesis also do not require fertilization and produce direct-developing eggs that are indistinguishable from eggs produced by parthenogenesis in cyclical lineages. Parthenogenesis appears to involve initial meiotic chromosome pairing. During both cyclic and obligate parthenogenesis a polar body is extruded during cell division indicating initiation of meiosis.

D. pulex is able to mate with another species of water flea known as D. pulicaria, although they use slightly different reproductive systems. These hybrids are often confused with their parent species due to their close resemblance to both.
