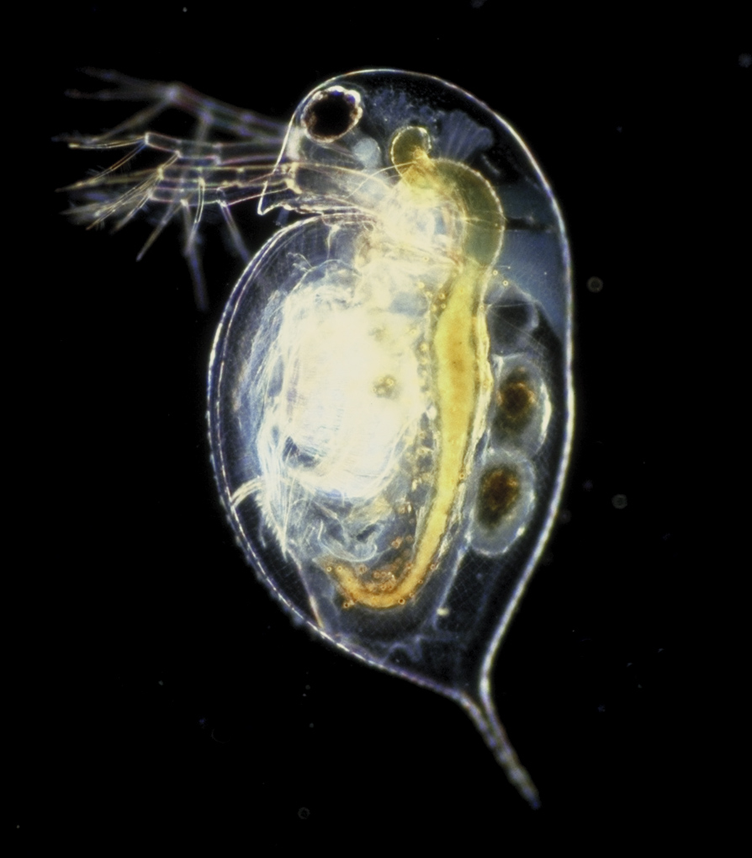
- Daphnia pulex

Scientific classification
- Kingdom: Animalia
- Phylum: Arthropoda
- Clade: Pancrustacea
- Class: Branchiopoda
- Order: Anomopoda
- Family: Daphniidae; Straus, 1820

= Daphniidae =

Family of small freshwater animals

Daphniidae is a family of water fleas in the order Anomopoda.

== Description ==
Members of the family Daphniidae differ from other, similar diplostracans, such as the Macrotrichidae and Moinidae, in that the antennae of females are short and immobile.

== Ecology ==
The feeding mechanism of the members of the family Daphniidae differs from that of the Macrotrichidae in allowing the animals to engage in filter feeding, rather than having to scrape food from a surface. They have evolved to fill a number of different ecological niches. Scapholeberis and Megafenestra contain species adapted to living around the surface film; Simocephalus species cling to objects while filter feeding; others have developed a pelagic lifestyle. A lot of Daphniidae have accidentally been introduced by humans to areas outside of their native range.

== Taxonomy ==
The family Daphniidae contains 121 species in five genera:

- Ceriodaphnia Dana, 1853
- Daphnia O. F. Müller, 1785
- Megafenestra Dumont & Pensaert, 1983
- Scapholeberis Schoedler, 1858
- Simocephalus Schoedler, 1858

The members of the family Moinidae may also be placed among the Daphniidae.

== See also ==
- Daphnia pulicaria
- Daphnia pulex
- Ceriodaphnia dubia
