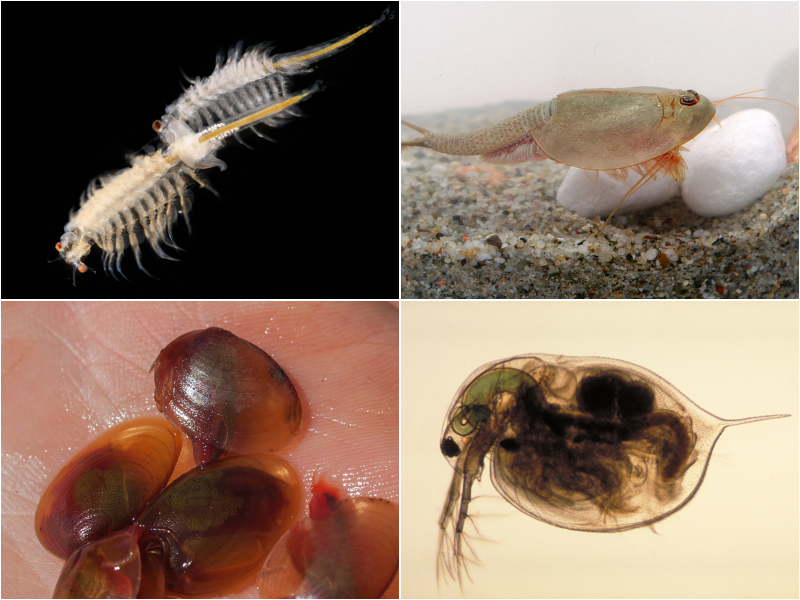
- Clockwise from top left: Artemia (Anostraca), Triops (Notostraca), Daphnia (Cladocera) & Cyzicus (Spinicaudata)

Scientific classification
- Kingdom: Animalia
- Phylum: Arthropoda
- Clade: Pancrustacea
- Clade: Allotriocarida
- Class: Branchiopoda; Latreille, 1817

Subclasses
- Sarsostraca Tasch, 1969; Phyllopoda Preuss, 1951

= Branchiopoda =

Branchiopoda Temporal range: Upper Cambrian–Recent

Class of crustaceans

Branchiopoda (from Ancient Greek βράγχια (bránkhia), meaning "gill", and πούς (poús), meaning "foot") is a class of crustaceans. It comprises fairy shrimp, clam shrimp, Diplostraca (or Cladocera), Notostraca, the Devonian Lepidocaris and possibly the Cambrian Rehbachiella. They are mostly small, freshwater animals that feed on plankton and detritus.

== Description ==
Members of the Branchiopoda are unified by the presence of gills on many of the animals' appendages, including some of the mouthparts. This is also responsible for the name of the group (from the Ancient Greek: βράγχια, gills, akin to βρόγχος, windpipe; Greek: πούς, foot). They generally possess compound eyes and a carapace, which may be a shell of two valves enclosing the trunk (as in most Cladocera), broad and shallow (as in the Notostraca), or entirely absent (as in the Anostraca). In the groups where the carapace prevents the use of the trunk limbs for swimming (Cladocera and clam shrimp), the antennae are used for locomotion, as they are in the nauplius. Male fairy shrimp have an enlarged pair of antennae with which they grasp the female during mating, while in the bottom-feeding Notostraca, the antennae are reduced to vestiges. The trunk limbs are beaten in a metachronal rhythm, causing a flow of water along the midline of the animal, from which it derives oxygen, food and, in the case of the Anostraca and Notostraca, movement.

== Ecology ==
Branchiopods are found in continental fresh water, including temporary pools and in hypersaline lakes, and some in brackish water. Only two groups of water fleas include marine species: Family Podonidae in the order Diplostraca, and family Sididae in the order Diplostraca. Most branchiopodans eat floating detritus or plankton, which they take using the setae on their appendages. But notostracans are omnivorous and very opportunistic feeders and will eat algae and bacteria in addition to animals as both predators and scavengers.

== Taxonomy ==
In early taxonomic treatments, the current members of the Branchiopoda were all placed in a single genus, Monoculus. The taxon Branchiopoda was erected by Pierre André Latreille in 1817, initially at the rank of order.

The current upper-level classification of Branchiopoda, according to the World Register of Marine Species (2021), is as follows:

Class Branchiopoda Latreille, 1817

Subclass Sarsostraca Tasch, 1969

Order Anostraca Sars, 1867

Suborder Anostracina Weekers et al., 2002
Suborder Artemiina Weekers et al., 2002

Subclass Phyllopoda Preuss, 1951

Superorder Diplostraca Gerstaecker, 1866

Order Anomopoda G.O. Sars, 1865
Order Ctenopoda G.O. Sars, 1865
Order Cyclestherida Sars G.O., 1899
Order Haplopoda G.O. Sars, 1865
Order Laevicaudata Linder, 1945
Order Onychopoda G.O. Sars, 1865
Order Spinicaudata Linder, 1945

Order Notostraca G. O. Sars, 1867
Genus †Rehbachiella? Müller, 1983

In addition, the extinct genus Lepidocaris is generally placed in Branchiopoda.

The following cladogram is based on a 2023 phylogenetic analysis using bayesian inference and maximum likelihood:

- - Parastacidae
    Paranephrops
  - Parathelphusidae
    Somanniathelphusa
  - - Triopsidae
      - Lepidurus
      - Triops
    - - - Leptestheriidae
          Leptestheria
        - Limnadiidae
          - Limnadia
          - Gondwanalimnadia
      - - - - Chirocephalidae
              Eubranchipus
            - Branchinectidae
              Branchinecta
          - - - Phallocryptus
              - Thamnocephalidae
                Branchinella
            - Artemiidae
              Artemia
        - - Sididae
            Diaphanosoma
          - - Bosminidae
              Bosmina
            - - - Chydoridae
                  Ovalona
                - Moinidae
                  Moina
              - Daphniidae
                - Scapholeberis
                - - - Simocephalus
                    - Ceriodaphnia
                  - Daphnia

=== Anostraca ===
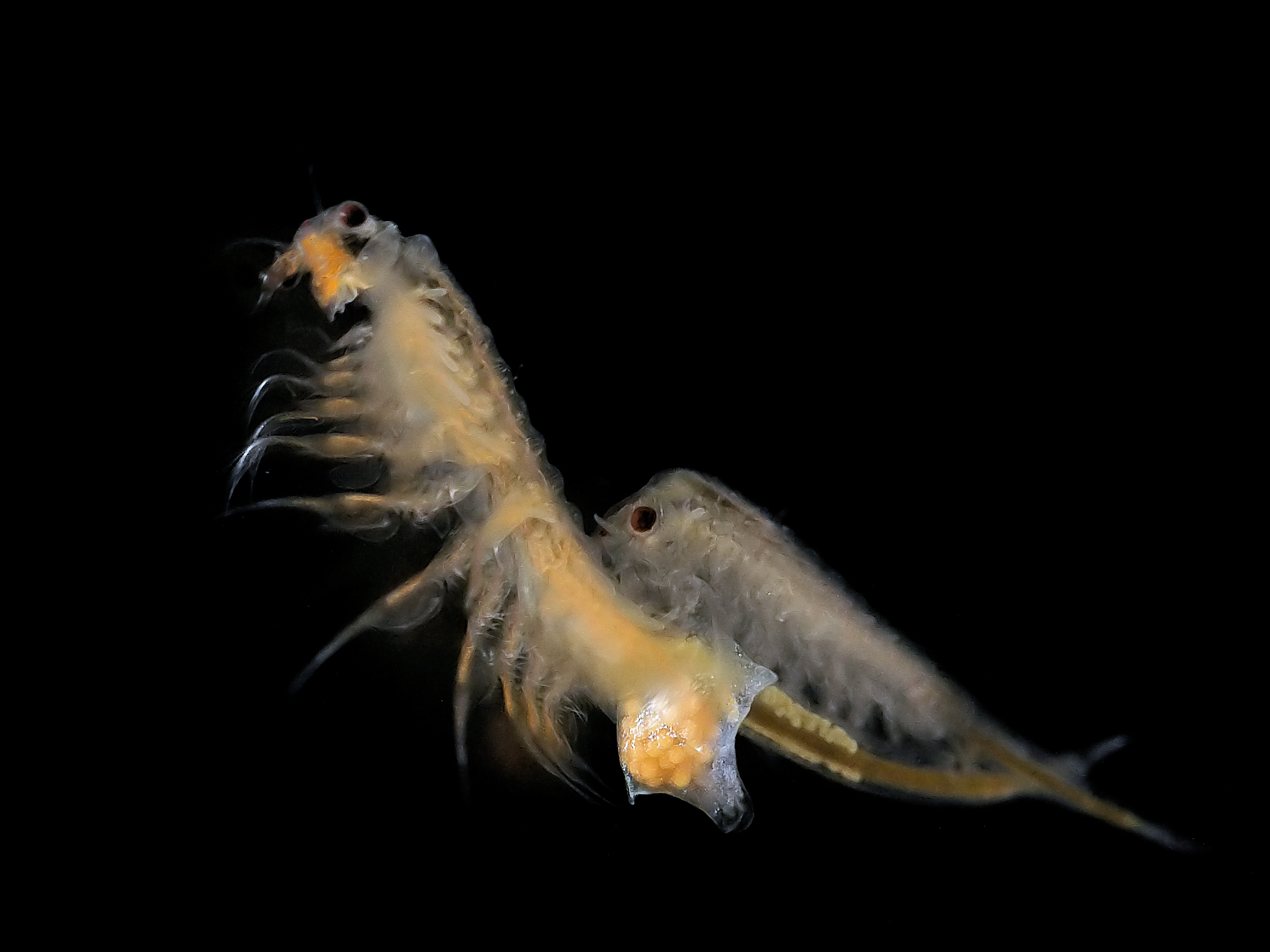
Artemia salina (Anostraca: Artemiidae)

The fairy shrimp of the order Anostraca are usually 6–25 mm (0.24–0.98 in) long (exceptionally up to 170 mm or 6.7 in). Most species have 20 body segments, bearing 11 pairs of leaf-like phyllopodia (swimming legs), and the body lacks a carapace. They live in vernal pools and hypersaline lakes across the world, including pools in deserts, in ice-covered mountain lakes and in Antarctica. They swim "upside-down" and feed by filtering organic particles from the water or by scraping algae from surfaces. They are an important food for many birds and fish, and are cultured and harvested for use as fish food. There are 300 species spread across 8 families.

=== Lipostraca ===
Lipostraca contains a single extinct Early Devonian species, Lepidocaris rhyniensis, which is the most abundant animal in the Rhynie chert deposits. It resembles modern Anostraca, to which it is probably closely related, although its relationships to other orders remain unclear. The body is 3 mm (0.12 in) long, with 23 body segments and 19 pairs of appendages, but no carapace. It occurred chiefly among charophytes, probably in alkaline temporary pools.

=== Notostraca ===
The order Notostraca comprises the single family Triopsidae, containing the tadpole shrimp or shield shrimp. The two genera, Triops and Lepidurus, are considered living fossils, having not changed significantly in outward form since the Triassic. They have a broad, flat carapace, which conceals the head and bears a single pair of compound eyes. The abdomen is long, appears to be segmented and bears numerous pairs of flattened legs. The telson is flanked by a pair of long, thin caudal rami. Phenotypic plasticity within taxa makes species-level identification difficult, and is further compounded by variation in the mode of reproduction. The evidence of phenotypic plasticity of Arctic tadpole shrimp (Lepidurus arcticus, Notostraca) has been observed in Svalbard. Notostracans are the largest branchiopodans and are omnivores living on the bottom of temporary pools, ponds and shallow lakes.

=== Laevicaudata, Spinicaudata and Cyclestherida (once Conchostraca) ===
Clam shrimp are bivalved animals which have lived since at least the Devonian. The three groups are not believed to form a clade. They have 10–32 trunk segments, decreasing in size from front to back, and each bears a pair of legs which also carry gills. A strong muscle can close the two halves of the shell together.

=== Anomopoda, Ctenopoda, Onychopoda, and Haplopoda (once Cladocera) ===
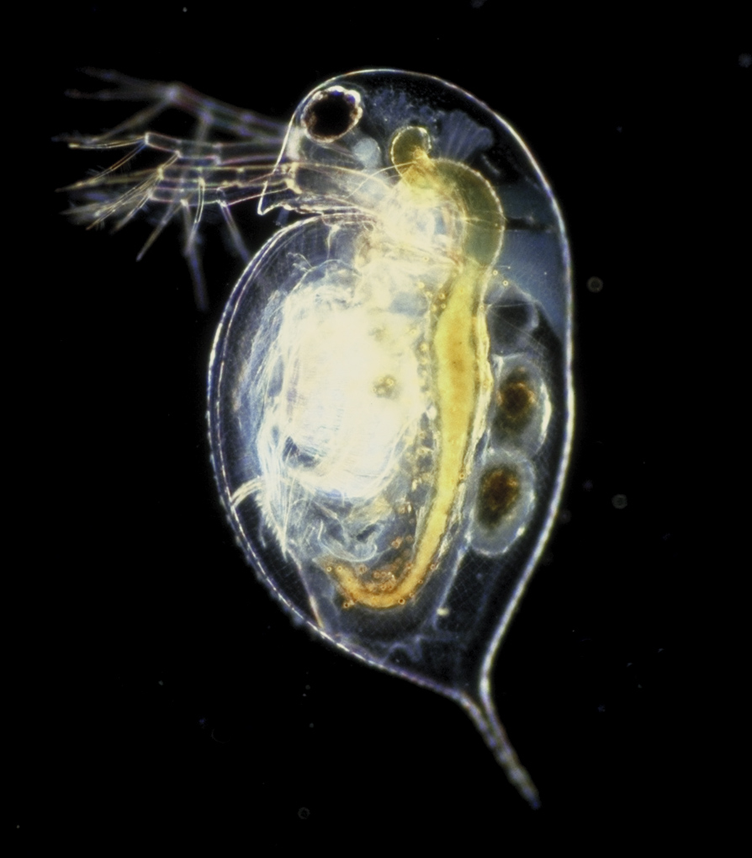
Daphnia pulex (Cladocera: Daphniidae)

These four orders make up a group of small crustaceans commonly called water fleas. Around 620 species have been recognised so far, with many more undescribed. They are ubiquitous in inland aquatic habitats, but rare in the oceans. Most are 0.2–6.0 mm (0.01–0.24 in) long, with a down-turned head, and a carapace covering the apparently unsegmented thorax and abdomen. There is a single median compound eye. Most species show cyclical parthenogenesis, where asexual reproduction is occasionally supplemented by sexual reproduction, which produces resting eggs that allow the species to survive harsh conditions and disperse to distant habitats. In the water bodies of the world, a lot of Cladocera are non-native species, many of which pose a great threat to aquatic ecosystems.

== Evolution ==
The fossil record of branchiopods extends back at least into the Upper Cambrian and possibly further. The group is thought to be monophyletic, with the Anostraca having been the first group to branch off. It is thought that the group evolved in the seas, but was forced into temporary pools and hypersaline lakes by the evolution of bony fishes. Although they were previously considered the sister group to the remaining crustaceans, it is now widely accepted that crustaceans form a paraphyletic group, and Branchiopoda are thought to be sister to a clade comprising Xenocarida (Remipedia and Cephalocarida) and Hexapoda (insects and their relatives).

== See also ==
- Vladicaris
