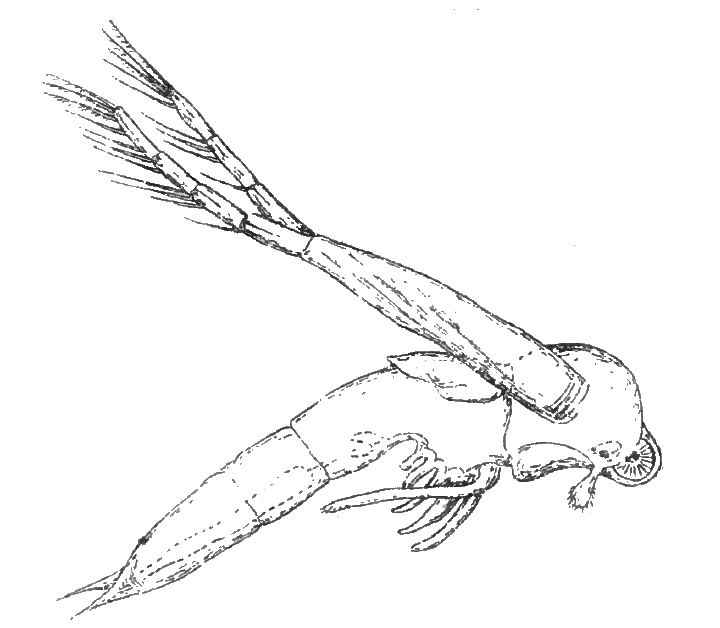
- Leptodora kindtii

Scientific classification
- Kingdom: Animalia
- Phylum: Arthropoda
- Class: Branchiopoda
- Order: Haplopoda; G. O. Sars, 1865
- Family: Leptodoridae; Lilljeborg, 1861
- Genus: Leptodora; Lilljeborg, 1861

Species
- Leptodora kindtii (Focke, 1844); Leptodora richardii Korovchinsky, 2009

Synonyms
- Hyalosoma Wagner, 1868

= Leptodora =

Genus of small freshwater animals

Leptodora is a genus containing two species of large, nearly transparent predatory water fleas. They grow up to 21 mm (0.83 in) long, with two large antennae used for swimming and a single compound eye. The legs are used to catch copepods that it comes into contact with by chance. Leptodora kindtii is found in temperate lakes across the Northern Hemisphere and is probably the only water flea species ever described in a newspaper; L. richardi is only known from eastern Russia. For most of the year, Leptodora reproduces parthenogenetically, with males only appearing late in the season, to produce winter eggs which hatch the following spring. Leptodora is the only genus in its family, the Leptodoridae, and suborder, Haplopoda.

== Description ==
Adults of Leptodora are the largest planktonic cladocerans native to North America; reports vary concerning the largest size, but adult females typically grow to 12 mm (0.47 in) long, but with some reports of females up to 21 mm (0.83 in). They are about 98% transparent, as a defense against predation by fish. Lilljeborg notes:

Das Weibchen ist in so hohem Grade durchsichtig, in wahrem Sinne »wasserhell», dass oft nur die Bewegungen ihr Dasein in dem Wasser verrathen. Bei auffallendem Sonnenlicht wird gewöhnlich der Schatten früher als das Thier selbst entdeckt.

The female is transparent to such a high degree, literally "as clear as water", that her presence is often only given away by her movements. In bright sunlight, the shadow is normally seen before the animal itself.

The male is similarly transparent. The abdomen is elongated, but the carapace is small and only covers the brood pouch.

The six pairs of thoracic appendages form a "feeding basket" which is used to capture prey. The second antennae are used for swimming, while the first antennae are rudimentary in females but elongated in males, where they are used in sexual reproduction. There is a single large compound eye which takes up much of the animal's head. It comprises around 500 facets, which are spherically arranged, and the whole eye is movable by up to 10° in any direction.

== Distribution ==
Leptodora kindtii is widespread in northern temperate lakes. In North America, it occurs as far south as Texas and Oklahoma. It is also found across Europe, in parts of North Africa, northern Arabia, and in Asia (north of the Himalaya).

== Ecology and behaviour ==
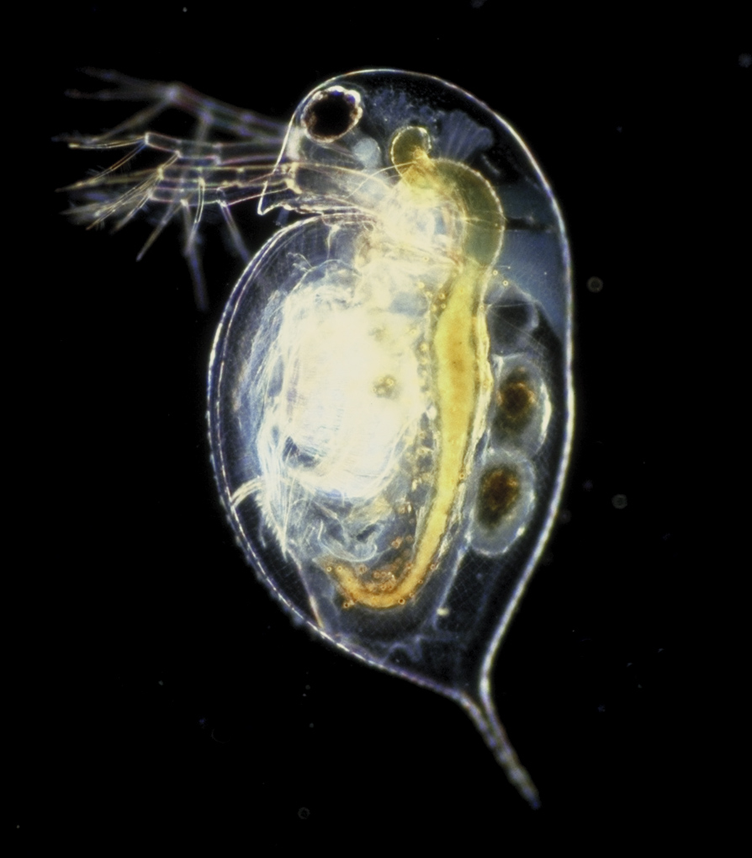
Daphnia is an important prey item for Leptodora kindtii.

Leptodora kindtii is a voracious predator and is capable of controlling numbers of its preferred prey items, which are generally juveniles of Daphnia, Bosmina, Ceriodaphnia, Diaphanosoma, Diaptomus, Polyphemus and Cyclops. It seems to encounter its prey by chance, with contact initiating a reflex, in which the abdomen is brought forward to close the feeding basket. In many cases, the prey escapes this haphazard response. Juvenile Daphnia are slower than adults to respond to the predator's attack, and are therefore more likely to be caught.

The most important predators of Leptodora are fishes, including whitefish, perch, ziege and bleak.

In Lake Biwa, Japan, L. kindtii is parasitised by the nematode Raphidascaris biwakoensis, a parasite of fish.

== Life cycle ==
Female Leptodora produce a brood of eggs through parthenogenesis every 12 hours. These eggs hatch into a larval stage about 2 millimetres (0.079 in) long. There are six further instars before the adult form is reached with a length of 6 millimetres (0.24 in). The time taken to reach adulthood is temperature dependent, but takes between 3 and 6 days. For most of the year, reproduction is parthenogenetic, with eggs being produced by females without males being present in the population. In the autumn, parthenogenetically produced males begin to appear; males and females then reproduce sexually. The resulting eggs sink to the bottom where they overwinter, hatching the following year as nauplius-like larvae.

== Related taxa ==
Leptodora is so distinct from other cladocerans that some authors have suggested grouping all other cladocerans into a clade called "Eucladocera", with Leptodora as its sister group. It is now believed, however, that Leptodora is sister to Onychopoda, being the only genus in the family Leptodoridae and the subclass Haplopoda. Features which separate it from other families include its large size, the lack of branchial appendages (gills) on its legs, the reduction of the carapace, and the fact that the winter eggs hatch as nauplii.

== Taxonomic history ==
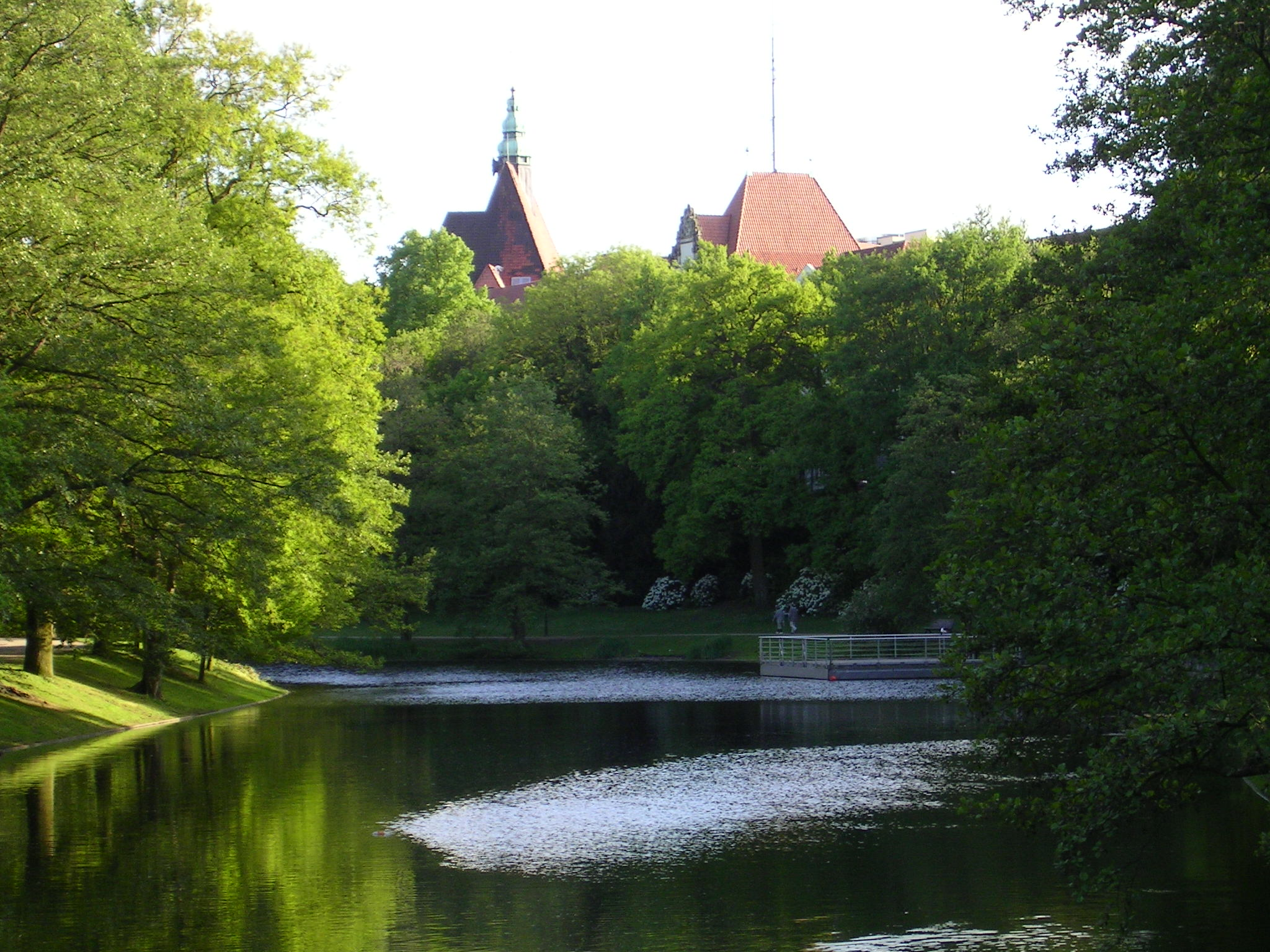
Leptodora was first found in the Bremer Stadtgraben, and described by the local scientist G. W. Focke.

Leptodora kindtii is "probably the only cladoceran ever described in a newspaper". The German microscopist Gustav Woldemar Focke organised a scientific meeting in Bremen in 1844 together with the pharmacist Georg Christian Kindt. He studied the fauna of the ditches surrounding the city (the Bremer Stadtgraben) and displayed live specimens at the meeting. During the meeting, he also published a description of the species in the Weser-Zeitung on Sunday September 22, 1844, placing the species in the genus Polyphemus. However, this description was ignored by the scientific community, and Wilhelm Lilljeborg described the species in 1861 with the name Leptodora hyalina. The synonymy was not noticed until Simon Albrecht Poppe informed Lilljeborg of it in 1889, and Lilljeborg corrected the error in his 1900 monograph.

In 2009, a second species, Leptodora richardii, was described from individuals collected from lakes in the Amur River basin, including Lake Bolon.

=== Synonyms ===
Synonyms of Leptodora kindtii include:

- Polyphemus kindti Focke, 1844
- Hyalosoma dux Wagner, 1868
- Leptodora angusta Sars, 1890
- Leptodora hyalina Lilljeborg, 1861
- Leptodora pellucida Joseph, 1882

=== Etymology ===
The name Leptodora is from the Greek words leptos and dora, collectively meaning thin-skinned. The specific epithet kindtii is presumed to refer to G. C. Kindt, who worked closely with Focke. The alternative spelling kindti is sometimes encountered, but is no longer considered correct under the International Code of Zoological Nomenclature. The epithet hyalina, used by Lilljeborg, is from the Greek ὕαλος, and means glassy.
