= Ilyocryptus sordidus =

Scientific classification
- Domain: Eukaryota
- Kingdom: Animalia
- Phylum: Arthropoda
- Class: Branchiopoda
- Order: Anomopoda
- Family: Ilyocryptidae
- Genus: Ilyocryptus
- Species: I. sordidus

Binomial name
- Ilyocryptus sordidus Liévin, 1848

Synonyms
- Acanthocercus sordidus Liévin, 1848; Iliocryptus aequalis Romijn, 1919; Iliocryptus balatonicus Hankó, 1926; Iliocryptus inaequalis Romijn, 1919; Ilyocryptus alexandrinae Negrea, 1987

Species of small freshwater crustacean

Ilyocryptus sordidus is a crustacean of the family Ilyocryptidae, a freshwater water flea.

== Anatomy ==
Ilyocryptus sordidus has an intense crimson colour, a small head and its dorsal edge is evenly curved. The second pair of antenna are especially short and coarse. The spine at the base of the abdominal claw is long and slender.

Males measures 0.4–0.8 mm (0.016–0.031 in), while the females are 0.6–1.2 mm (0.024–0.047 in).

== Habitat ==
Ilyocryptus sordidus lives in the mud of freshwater lakes (inspiring the specific name sordidus, Latin for "dirty"), tolerating pH between 4.2 and 7.1.

== Distribution ==
It is found in most parts of the world, except for Southeast Asia.
