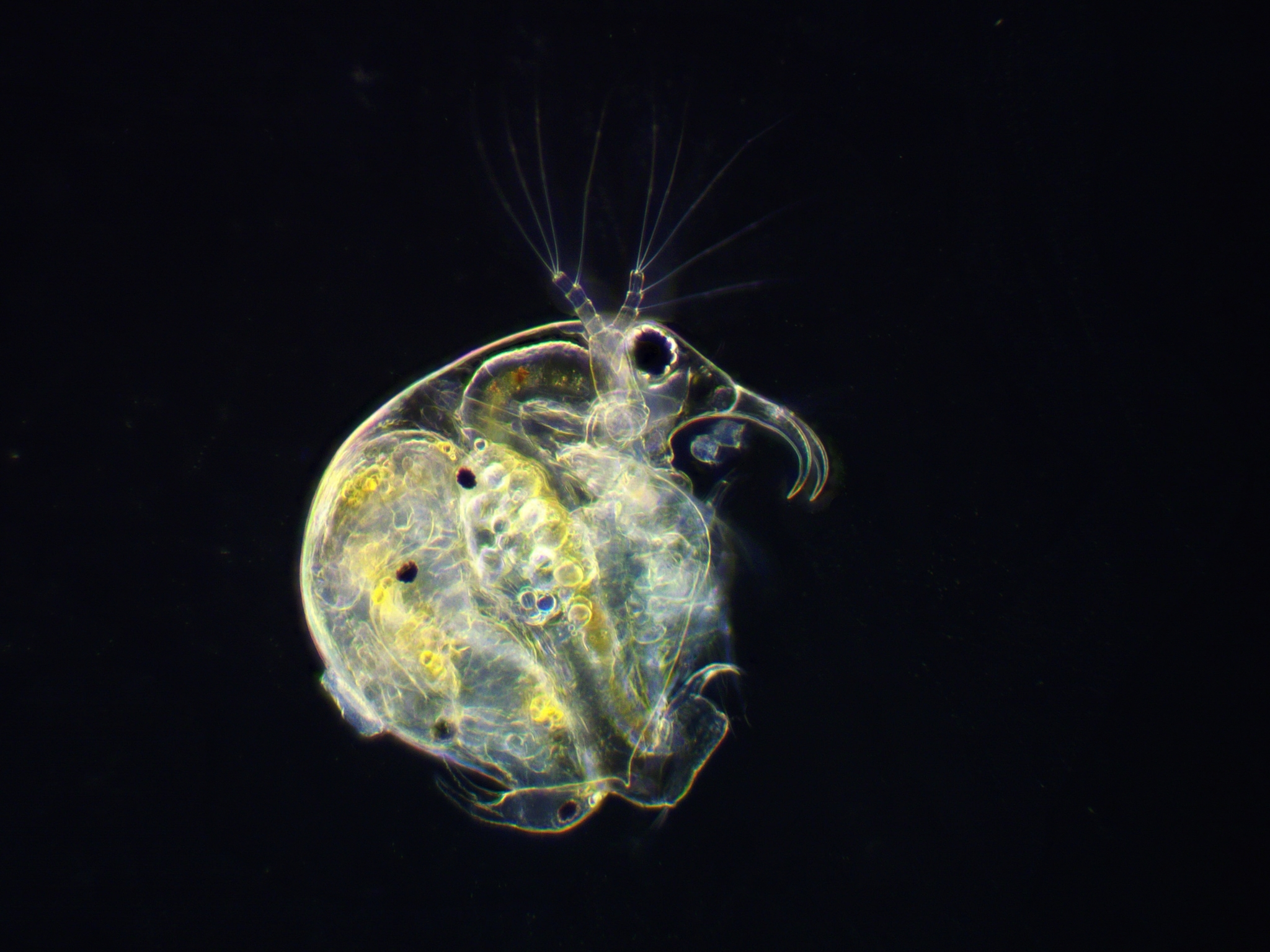

Scientific classification
- Kingdom: Animalia
- Phylum: Arthropoda
- Class: Branchiopoda
- Order: Anomopoda
- Family: Bosminidae
- Genus: Bosmina
- Species: B. longirostris

Binomial name
- Bosmina longirostris (O. F. Müller, 1776)

= Bosmina longirostris =

Species of small freshwater animal

Bosmina longirostris is a species of water flea found in the Great Lakes and Central Europe. It is found in the plankton near the shoreline of lakes and ponds.

== Morphotypes ==
Bosmina longirostris has multiple morphotypes. The most common morphotypes in freshwater are cornuta, pellucida, similis, and typica. The morphotypes refer to the size and curve of the antennules of the organism, as well as the size of the mucrones.
