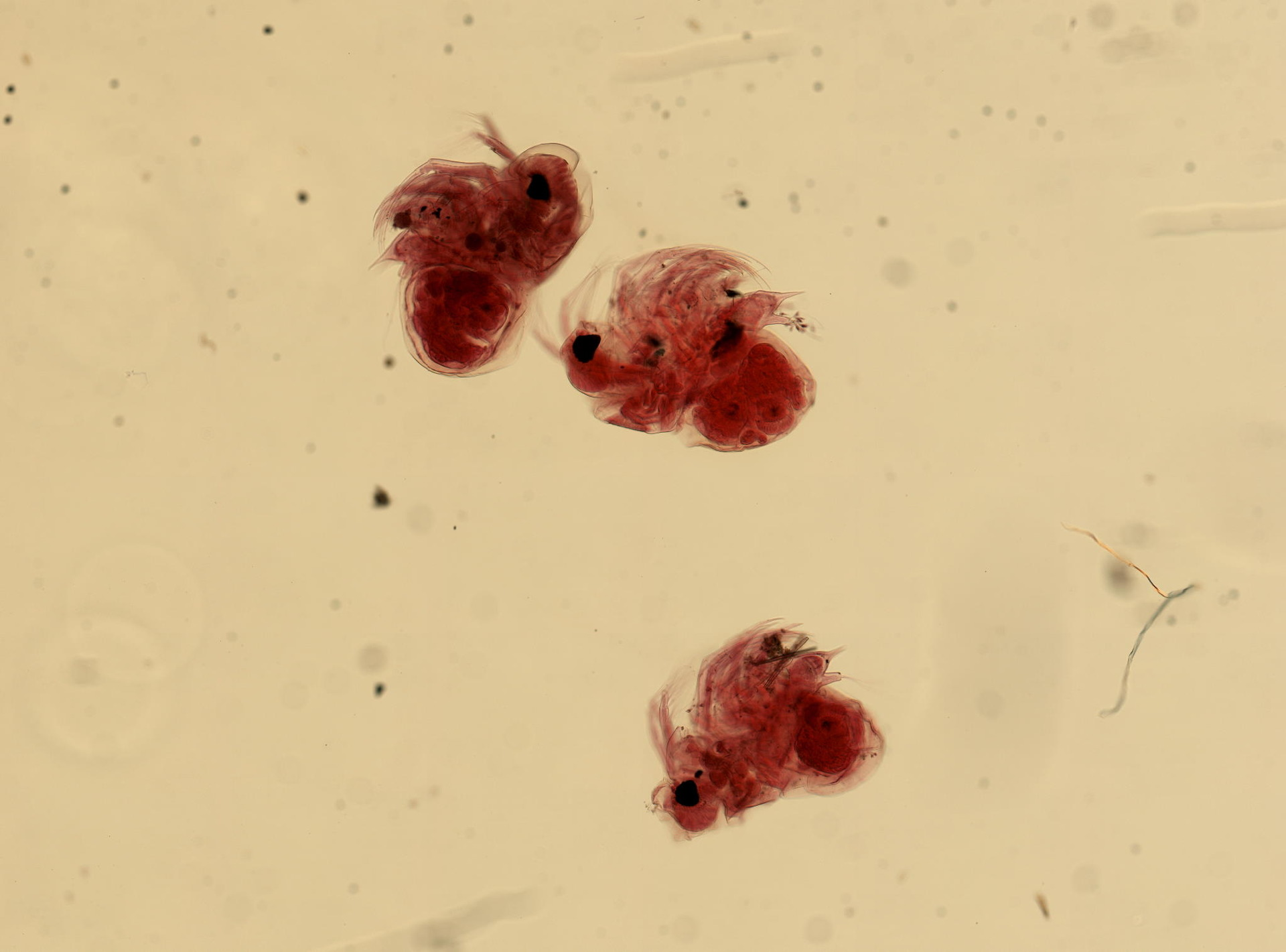

Scientific classification
- Domain: Eukaryota
- Kingdom: Animalia
- Phylum: Arthropoda
- Class: Branchiopoda
- Order: Onychopoda
- Family: Podonidae
- Genus: Podon
- Species: P. leuckartii

Binomial name
- Podon leuckartii (G. O. Sars, 1862)

= Podon leuckartii =

Species of small freshwater animal

Podon leuckartii is a species of onychopod in the family Podonidae.
