= Bosmina freyi =

Scientific classification
- Domain: Eukaryota
- Kingdom: Animalia
- Phylum: Arthropoda
- Class: Branchiopoda
- Order: Anomopoda
- Family: Bosminidae
- Genus: Bosmina
- Species: B. freyi

Binomial name
- Bosmina freyi De Melo & Hebert, 1994

Species of small freshwater animal

Bosmina freyi is a species of anomopod in the family Bosminidae.
