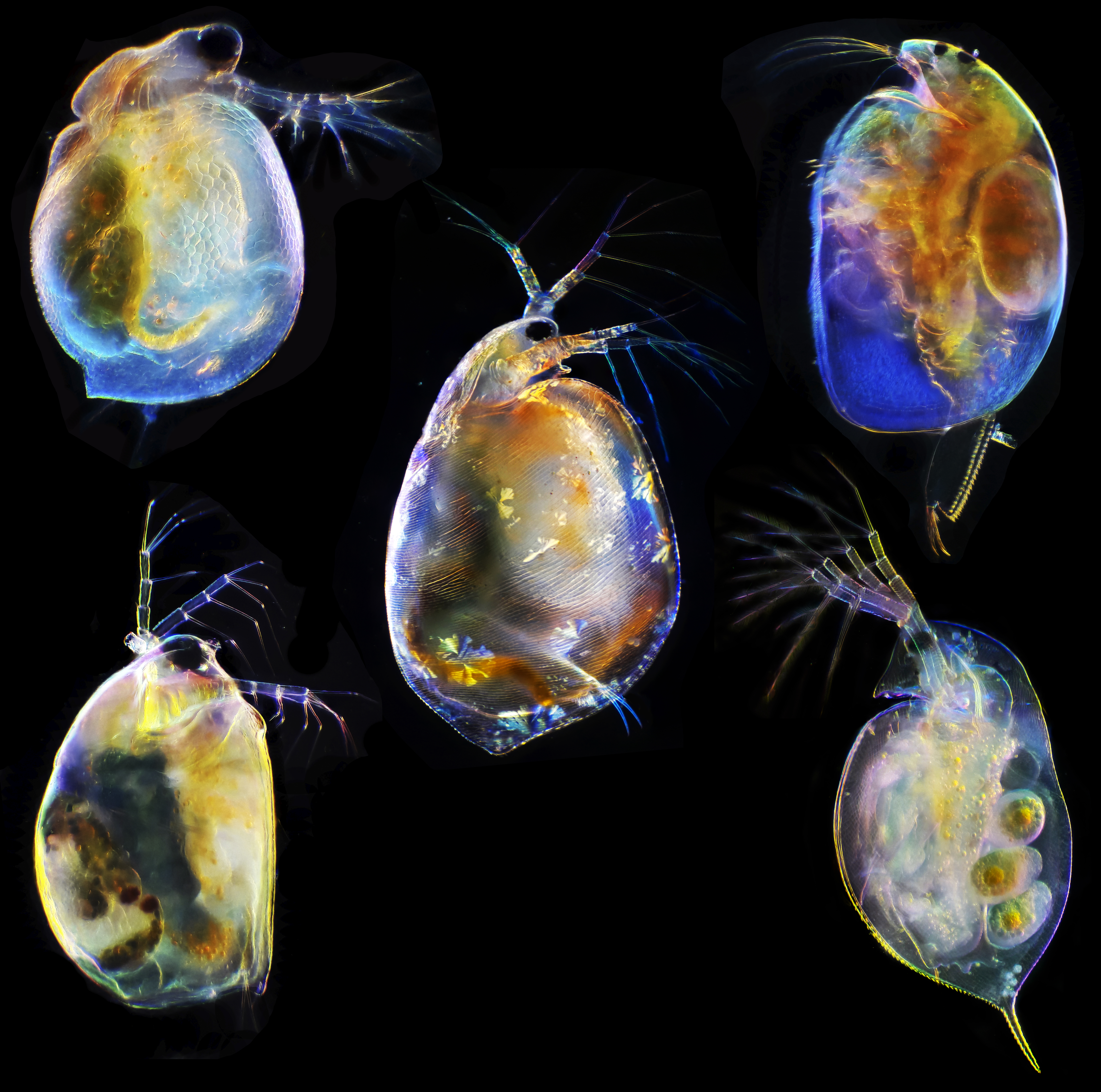

Scientific classification
- Kingdom: Animalia
- Phylum: Arthropoda
- Clade: Pancrustacea
- Class: Branchiopoda
- Subclass: Phyllopoda
- Order: Cladocera; Latreille, 1829

Orders
- Anomopoda G.O. Sars, 1865; Ctenopoda G.O. Sars, 1865; Haplopoda G.O. Sars, 1865; Onychopoda G.O. Sars, 1865

= Cladocera =

Cladocera Temporal range: Jurassic–Present

Order of small freshwater animals

Cladocera is a order of aquatic, largely freshwater crustaceans, commonly known as water fleas. Most cladocerans feed on microscopic chunks of organic matter, though some forms are predatory. Over 1000 species have been recognised so far, with many more undescribed. The oldest unequivocal fossils of water fleas date to the Jurassic, though their modern morphology suggests that they originated substantially earlier, during the Paleozoic. Some have also adapted to a life in the ocean, the only members of Branchiopoda to do so, though several anostracans live in hypersaline lakes. Most are 0.2–6.0 mm (0.01–0.24 in) long, with a down-turned head with a single median compound eye, and a carapace covering the apparently unsegmented thorax and abdomen. Most species show cyclical parthenogenesis, where asexual reproduction is occasionally supplemented by sexual reproduction, which produces resting eggs that allow the species to survive harsh conditions and disperse to distant habitats.

== Description ==
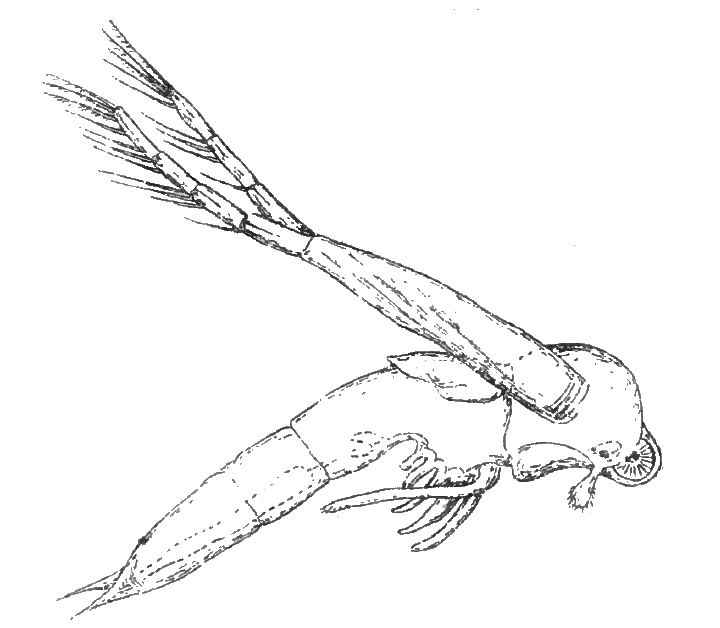
Leptodora kindtii is an unusually large cladoceran, at up to 18 mm long.

They are mostly 0.2–6.0 mm (0.01–0.24 in) long, with the exception of Leptodora, which can be up to 18 mm (0.71 in) long. The body is not obviously segmented and bears a folded carapace which covers the thorax and abdomen.

The head is angled downwards, and may be separated from the rest of the body by a "cervical sinus" or notch. It bears a single black compound eye, located on the animal's midline, in all but two genera, and often, a single ocellus is present. The head also bears two pairs of antennae – the first antennae are small, unsegmented appendages, while the second antennae are large, segmented, and branched, with powerful muscles. The first antennae bear olfactory setae, while the second are used for swimming by most species. The pattern of setae on the second antennae is useful for identification. The part of the head which projects in front of the first antennae is known as the rostrum or "beak".

The mouthparts are small, and consist of an unpaired labrum, a pair of mandibles, a pair of maxillae, and an unpaired labium. They are used to eat "organic detritus of all kinds" and bacteria.

The thorax bears five or six pairs of lobed, leaf-like appendages, each with numerous hairs or setae. Carbon dioxide is lost, and oxygen taken up, through the body surface.

== Lifecycle ==
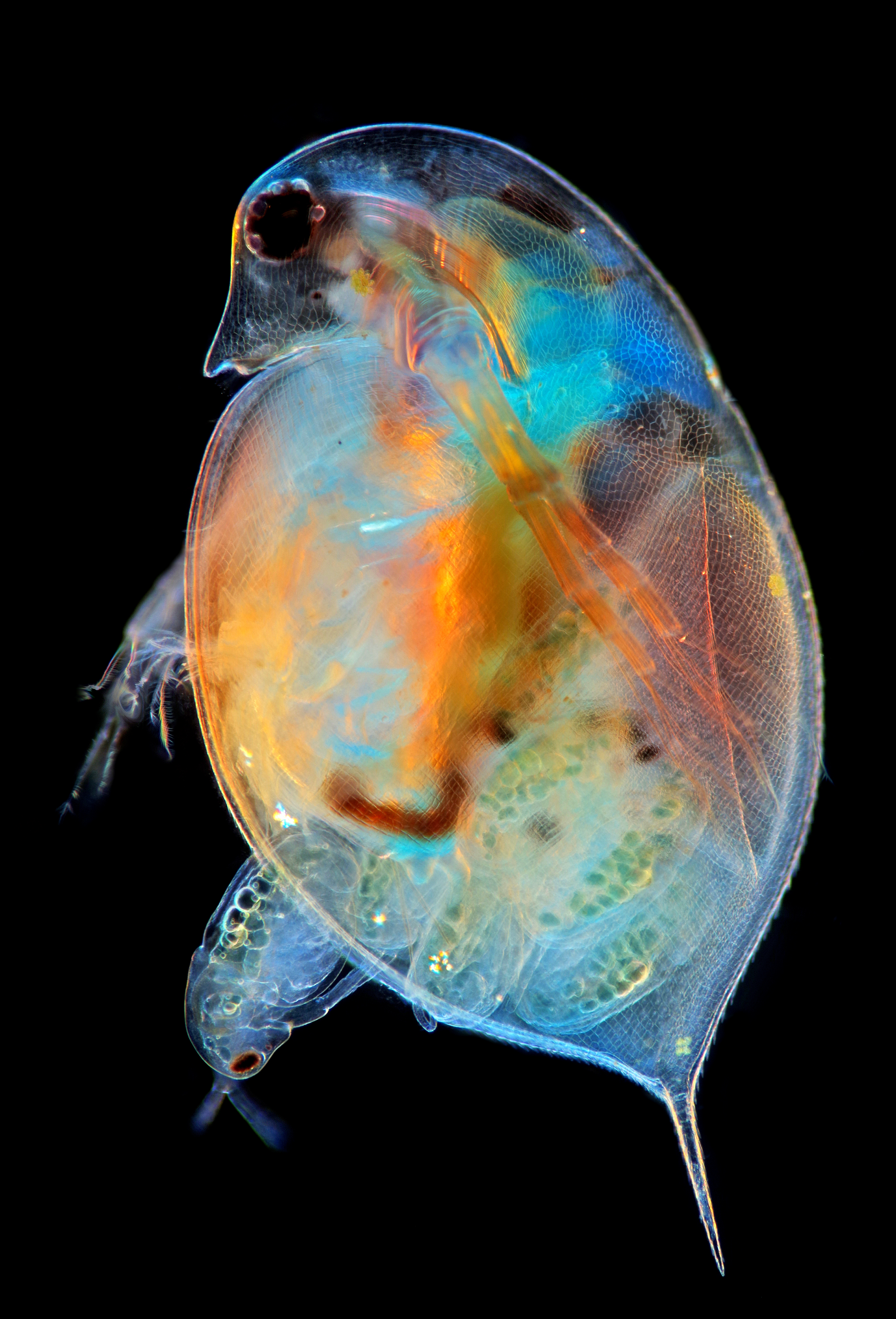
A cladocera giving birth (100x magnification)

With the exception of a few purely asexual species, the lifecycle of diplostracans is dominated by asexual reproduction, with occasional periods of sexual reproduction; this is known as cyclical parthenogenesis. When conditions are favourable, reproduction occurs by parthenogenesis for several generations, producing only female clones. As the conditions deteriorate, males are produced, and sexual reproduction occurs. This results in the production of long-lasting dormant eggs. These ephippial eggs can be transported over land by wind, and hatch when they reach favourable conditions, allowing many species to have very wide – even cosmopolitan – distributions. Except for the genus Leptodora, which has a metanauplius stage, a nauplius larval stage is absent in Diplostraca.

== Evolutionary history ==
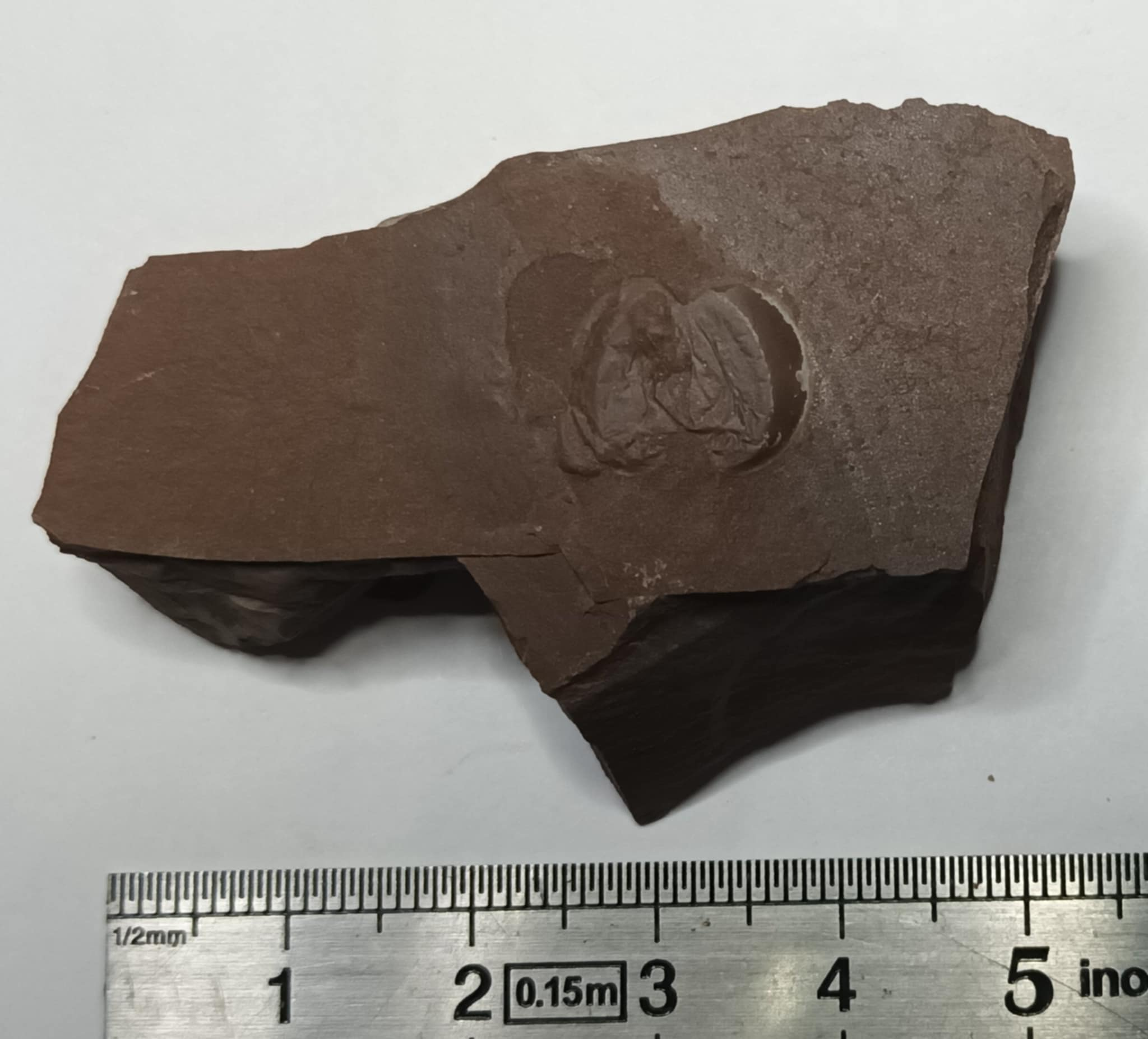
Exuviae of a middle Permian diplostracan from Hérault, France. Max Rouger Collection.

Diplostraca are nested within the clam shrimp, being most closely related to the order Cyclestherida, the only living genus of which is Cyclestheria. Though several fossils from the Paleozoic have been claimed to represent fossils of diplostracans, none of these records can be confirmed. The oldest confirmed records of diplostracans are from the Early Jurassic of Asia. Fossils from the Jurassic are assignable to modern as well as extinct groups, indicating that the initial radiation of the group occurred prior to the beginning of the Jurassic, likely during the late Paleozoic. A Devonian to Carboniferous genus, Ebullitiocaris, is tentatively placed as a diplostracan, however since it is only known from carapaces this is uncertain.

== Ecology ==
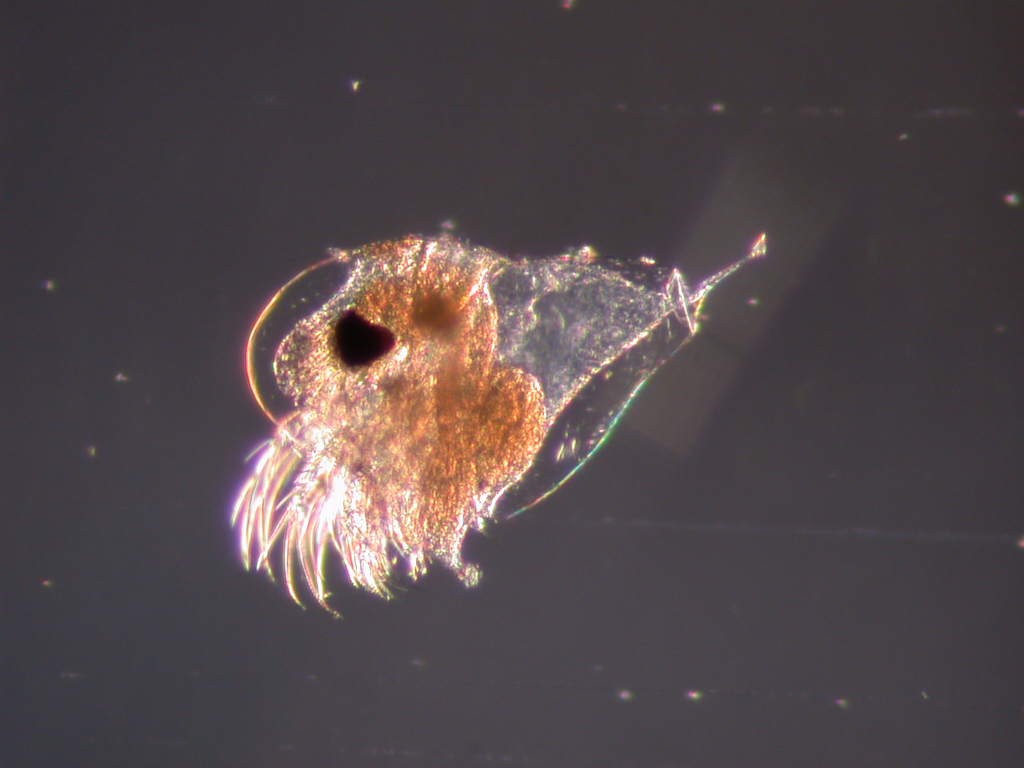
Evadne spinifera, one of very few marine diplostracan species

Most cladoceran species live in fresh water and other inland water bodies, with only eight species being truly oceanic. The marine species are all in the family Podonidae, except for the genus Penilia. Some cladocerans inhabit leaf litter.

== Taxonomy ==
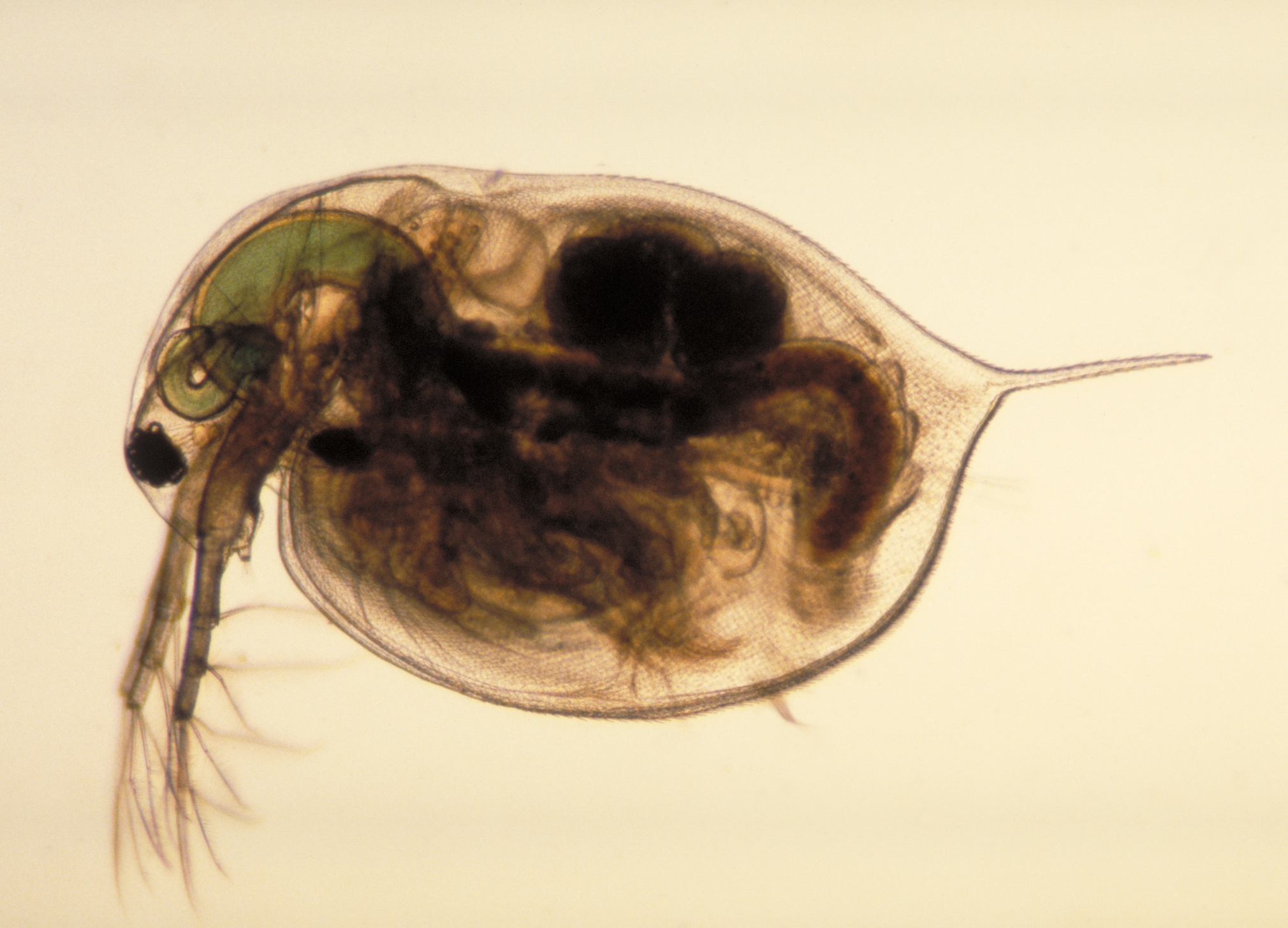
Daphnia magna

Cladocera is part of the broader group Diplostraca. The World Registry of Marine Species divides Branchiopoda into subclasses Phyllopoda and Sarsostraca, with the Phyllopoda divided into superorders Calmanostraca and Diplostraca. Traditionally, the Diplostraca was divided into Conchostraca (clam shrimp) and Cladocera (water fleas). However, the Conchostraca were found to be non-monophyletic and paraphyletic with respect to Cladocera using analysis of both morphological and molecular data. The World Registry of Marine Species treats Cladocera is a synonym of the superorder Diplostraca, although other taxonomic schemes still recognise order Cladocera for the water fleas.

The Diplostraca form a monophyletic group of 7 orders, about 24 families, and more than 11,000 species. Many more species remain undescribed. The genus Daphnia alone contains around 150 species. Many groups of the water fleas are cryptic species or species flocks.

The following families are recognised:

Cladocera

Order Anomopoda G.O. Sars, 1865

Family Acantholeberidae Smirnov, 1976
Family Bosminidae Baird, 1845
Family Chydoridae Dybowski & Grochowski, 1894
Family Daphniidae Straus, 1820
Family Dumontiidae Santos-Flores & Dodson, 2003
Family Eurycercidae Kurz, 1875
Family Gondwanothrichidae Van Damme, Shiel & Dumont, 2007
Family Ilyocryptidae Smirnov, 1976
Family Macrothricidae Norman & Brady, 1867
Family Moinidae Goulden, 1968
Family Ophryoxidae Smirnov, 1976

Order Ctenopoda G.O. Sars, 1865

Family Holopediidae G.O. Sars, 1865
Family Pseudopenilidae Korovchinsky & Sergeeva, 2008
Family Sididae Baird, 1850

Order Haplopoda G.O. Sars, 1865

Family Leptodoridae Lilljeborg, 1861

Order Onychopoda G.O. Sars, 1865

Family Cercopagididae Mordukhai-Boltovskoi, 1968
Family Podonidae Mordukhai-Boltovskoi, 1968
Family Polyphemidae Baird, 1845

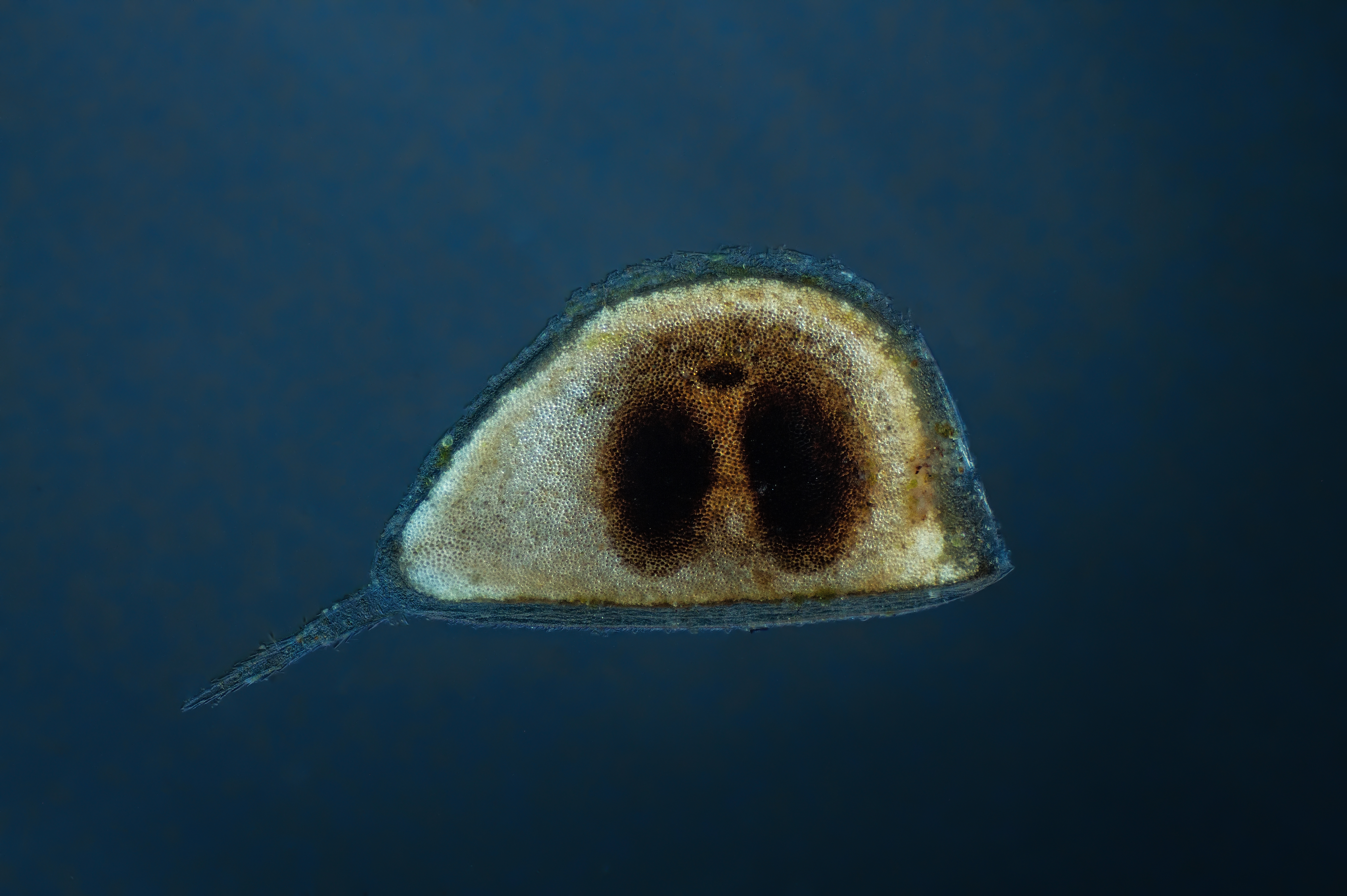
Ephippia (singular: ephippium) are winter or dry-season eggs of the various species of small crustacean in the order Cladocera (within the Branchiopoda); they are provided with an extra shell layer, which preserves and protects the resting stages inside from harsh environmental conditions until the more favorable times, such as spring, when the reproductive cycle is able to take place once again. Ephippia are part of the back of a mother carrying them until they are fully developed. After molting, the ephippium stays in the water, or in the soil of dried puddles, small ponds, and vernal pools. The resting stages are often called eggs, but are in fact embryos with arrested development. Ephippia can rest for many years before the embryo resumes development upon an appropriate hatching stimulus.

=== Etymology ===
The word "Cladocera" derives via Neo-Latin from the Ancient Greek κλάδος (kládos, "branch") and κέρας (kéras, "horn").

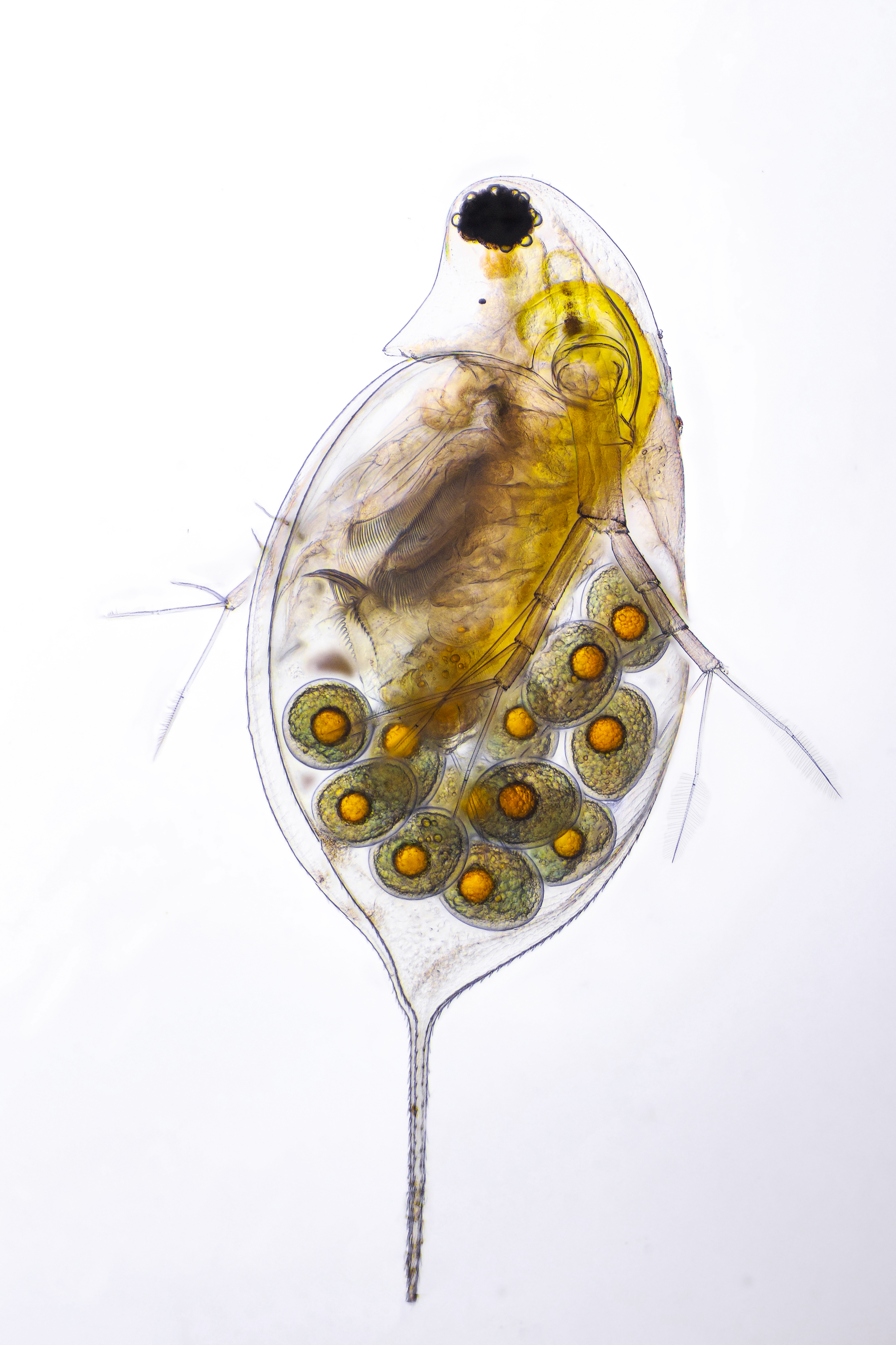
The water flea in the photo belongs to the daphnia family. In addition, the photo shows the embryo in her brood pocket

== See also ==
- Bythotrephes longimanus (invasive species) [formerly known as Bythotrephes cederstroemi] - Spiny Water Flea
- Cercopagis pengoi (invasive species)
- Daphnia lumholtzi (invasive species)
- Moina (smallest)
- Zooplankton
