= Cactus cactus =

Scientific classification
- Domain: Eukaryota
- Kingdom: Animalia
- Phylum: Arthropoda
- Class: Branchiopoda
- Order: Anomopoda
- Family: Macrothricidae
- Genus: Cactus; Smirnov, 1976
- Species: C. cactus

Binomial name
- Cactus cactus (Vávra, 1900)

Genus of small freshwater animals

Cactus is a genus of anomopods in the family Macrothricidae. There is only one described species, Cactus cactus. C. cactus can be found in Chile.
