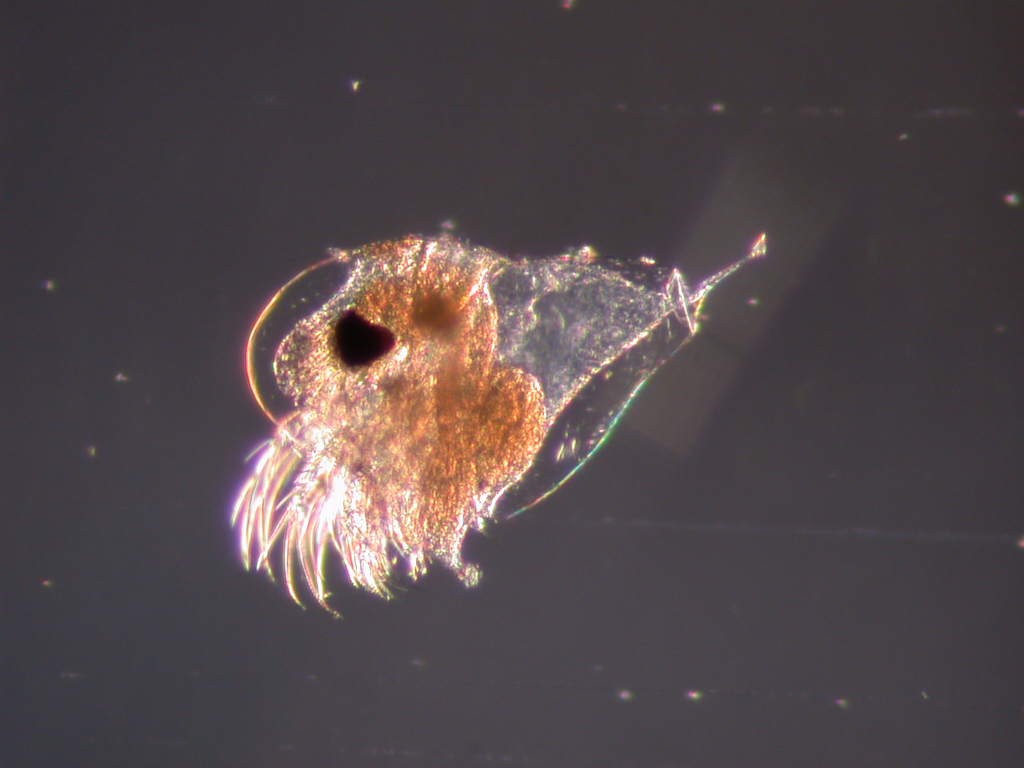
- Evadne spinifera

Scientific classification
- Kingdom: Animalia
- Phylum: Arthropoda
- Clade: Pancrustacea
- Class: Branchiopoda
- Order: Onychopoda
- Family: Podonidae
- Genus: Evadne; Lovén, 1836

= Evadne (crustacean) =

Genus of small freshwater animals

Evadne is a genus of water fleas in the family Podonidae. They occur in both marine, brackish, and freshwater environments.

== Species ==
There are four accepted species:

- Evadne anonyx Sars 1897
- Evadne nordmanni Lovén, 1836
- Evadne prolongata Behning 1938
- Evadne spinifera P. E. Müller, 1867
