= Macrothrix =

Scientific classification
- Domain: Eukaryota
- Kingdom: Animalia
- Phylum: Arthropoda
- Class: Branchiopoda
- Order: Anomopoda
- Family: Macrothricidae
- Genus: Macrothrix; Baird, 1843

Synonyms
- Drepanomacrothryx Werestschagin, 1913; Echinisca Liévin, 1848; Gurneyella Brehm, 1930; Iheringula G.O. Sars, 1900

Genus of small freshwater animals

Macrothrix is a genus of water fleas in the family Macrothricidae.

The genus was described in 1843 by William Baird, and has a cosmopolitan distribution.

== Species ==
There are 54 valid species assigned to the genus Macrothrix, including:

- Macrothrix acutirostris (Schmarda, 1854)
- Macrothrix agsensis Dumont, Silva Briano & Subhash Babu, 2002
- Macrothrix albuferae Arévalo, 1916
- Macrothrix atahualpa Brehm, 1936
- Macrothrix boergeni Studer, 1878
- Macrothrix brandorffi Kotov & Hollwedel, 2004
- Macrothrix brevicornis Shen Chia-jui, Tai Ai-yun & Chiang Sieh-chih, 1966
- Macrothrix breviseta Smirnov, 1976
- Macrothrix burstalis Smith, 1909
- Macrothrix camjatae Harding, 1955
- Macrothrix capensis (G.O. Sars, 1916)
- Macrothrix carinata (Smirnov, 1976)
- Macrothrix dadayi Behning, 1941
- Macrothrix elegans G.O. Sars, 1901
- Macrothrix flabelligera Smirvov, 1992
- Macrothrix flagellata (Smirnov & Timms, 1983)
- Macrothrix gauthieri (Smirnov, 1976)
- Macrothrix hardingi Petkovski, 1973
- Macrothrix hirsuticornis Norman & Brady, 1867
- Macrothrix hystrix Gurney, 1927
- Macrothrix indistincta Smirnov, 1992
- Macrothrix laticornis (Jurine, 1820)
- Macrothrix longiseta Smirnov, 1976
- Macrothrix magna Daday, 1902
- Macrothrix malaysiensis Idris & Fernando, 1981
- Macrothrix marthae Elías-Gutiérrez & Smirnov, 2000
- Macrothrix mexicanus Ciros-Pérez, Silva-Briano & Elías-Gutiérrez, 1996
- Macrothrix montana Birge, 1904
- Macrothrix novamexicana Herrick, 1895
- Macrothrix odiosa Gurney, 1916
- Macrothrix oviformis Ekman, 1900
- Macrothrix paulensis (G.O. Sars, 1900)
- Macrothrix pectinata (Smirnov, 1976)
- Macrothrix pennigera Shen Chia-Jui, Sung Ta-hsiang & Chen Kou-hsiao, 1961
- Macrothrix pholpunthini Kotov, Maiphae & Sanoamuang, 2005
- Macrothrix pseudospinosa Smirnov, 1992
- Macrothrix rectirostris Brehm, 1936
- Macrothrix rosea (Jurine, 1820)
- Macrothrix ruehei Kotov, 2007
- Macrothrix sarsi Kotov, 2007
- Macrothrix schauinslandi G.O. Sars, 1904
- Macrothrix shadini Mukhamediev, 1963
- Macrothrix sierrafriatensis Silva-Briano, Dieu & Dumont, 1999
- Macrothrix sioli Smirnov, 1982
- Macrothrix smirnovi Ciros-Pérez & Elías-Gutiérrez, 1997
- Macrothrix spinosa King, 1853
- Macrothrix superaculeata (Smirnov, 1982)
- Macrothrix tabrizensis Dumont, Silva Briano & Subhash Babu, 2002
- Macrothrix timmsi (Smirnov, 1976)
- Macrothrix tobaensis Johnson, 1956
- Macrothrix tripectinata Weisig, 1934
- Macrothrix triserialis Brady, 1886
- Macrothrix vietnamensis Silva-Briano, Dieu & Dumont, 1999
- Macrothrix williamsi (Smirnov & Timms, 1983)
