= Lathonura =

Scientific classification
- Domain: Eukaryota
- Kingdom: Animalia
- Phylum: Arthropoda
- Class: Branchiopoda
- Order: Anomopoda
- Family: Macrothricidae
- Genus: Lathonura; Lilljeborg, 1853

Synonyms
- Daphnarella Rousselet, 1908

Genus of small freshwater animals

Lathonura is a genus of Macrothricidae.

The genus was described in 1853 by Lilljeborg.

It has cosmopolitan distribution.

Species:

- Lathonura dorsispina Cosmovici, 1900
- Lathonura ovalis Mahoon, Ghauri & Butt, 1986
- Lathonura rectirostris (O.F. Müller, 1785)
