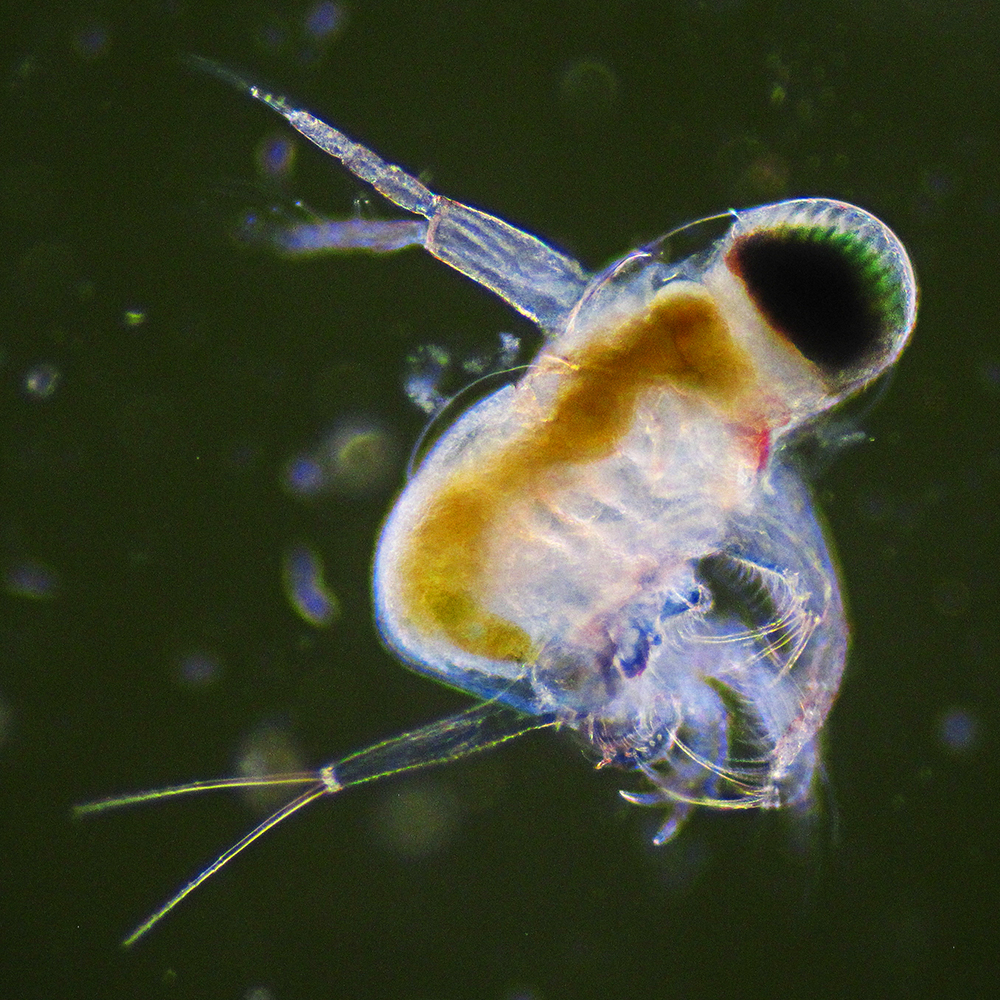

Scientific classification
- Kingdom: Animalia
- Phylum: Arthropoda
- Clade: Pancrustacea
- Class: Branchiopoda
- Order: Onychopoda
- Family: Polyphemidae
- Genus: Polyphemus
- Species: P. pediculus

Binomial name
- Polyphemus pediculus (Linnaeus, 1761)

= Polyphemus pediculus =

Species of small freshwater animal

Polyphemus pediculus is a species of onychopod in the family Polyphemidae. It is found throughout the Northern Hemisphere in freshwater systems.
