= Gustav Woldemar Focke =

German physician and naturalist

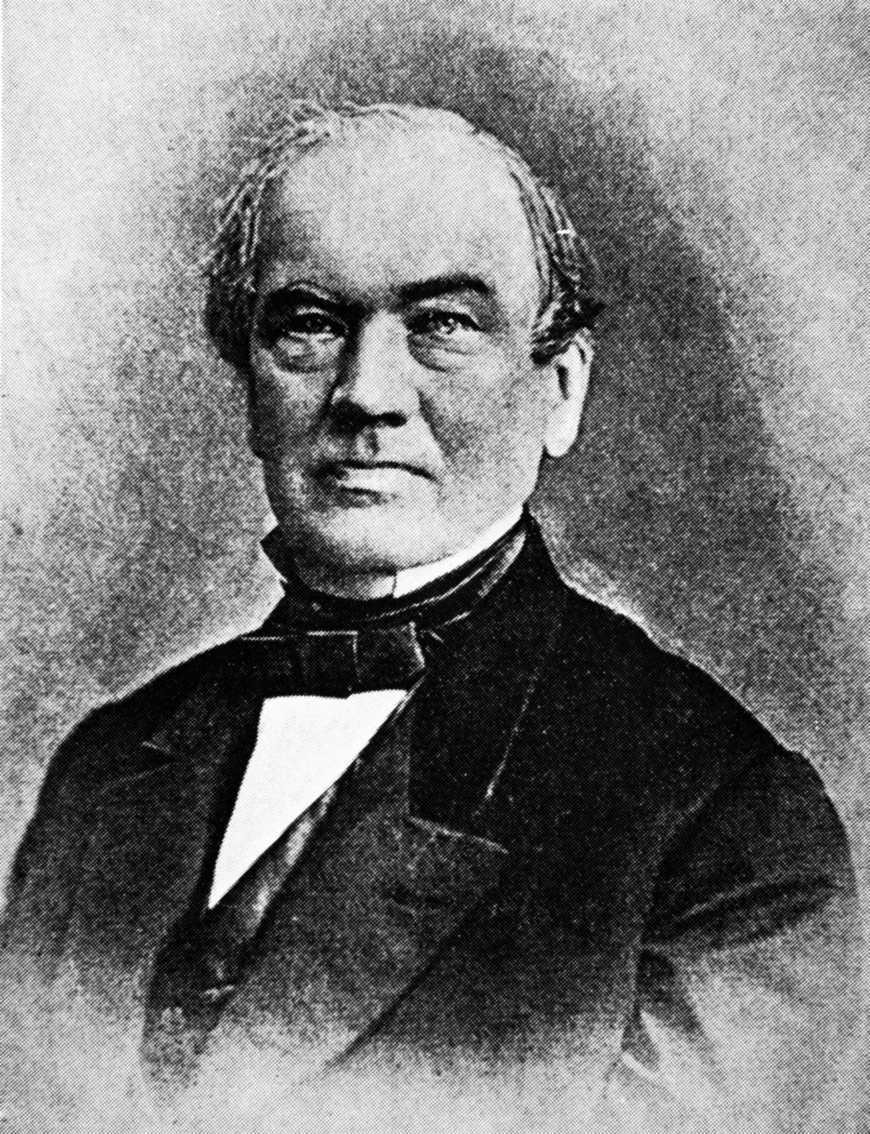
Gustav Woldemar Focke

Gustav Woldemar Focke (24 January 1810, Bremen – 1 June 1877, Bremen) was a German medical doctor and naturalist. He was a nephew of naturalist Gottfried Reinhold Treviranus.

He studied medicine at the University of Heidelberg, receiving his doctorate in 1833. Following graduation, he was engaged in scientific research during an extended trip to various locations — in Berlin, he was greatly influenced by the microscopic investigations being done by Christian Gottfried Ehrenberg. In 1835 he settled as a general practitioner in his hometown of Bremen. In 1869 he was named chairman of the Naturwissenschaftlichen Vereins zu Bremen.

In the field of phycology, he is known for his research involving desmids and diatoms. In 1844 he described the water flea Leptodora kindtii, a species that he named in honor of pharmacist Georg Christian Kindt (1793–1869). The genus Fockea (family Apocynaceae) was named after him by Stephan Endlicher.

== Selected works ==
- De respiratione vegetabilium. Commentatio inauguralis phytologica, 1833. (Of the respiration of vegetables: Inaugural phytological commentary)
- Über einige Organisationsverhältnisse bei polygastrischen Infusorien und Räderthieren. Isis. 1836; 10: 785–787.
- Planaria Ehrenbergii, 1836.
- Ein neues Infusorium. Abh. d. Naturw. Ver. zu Bremen. V. S. 103.
- Physiologische studien (2 volumes, 1847–54).
