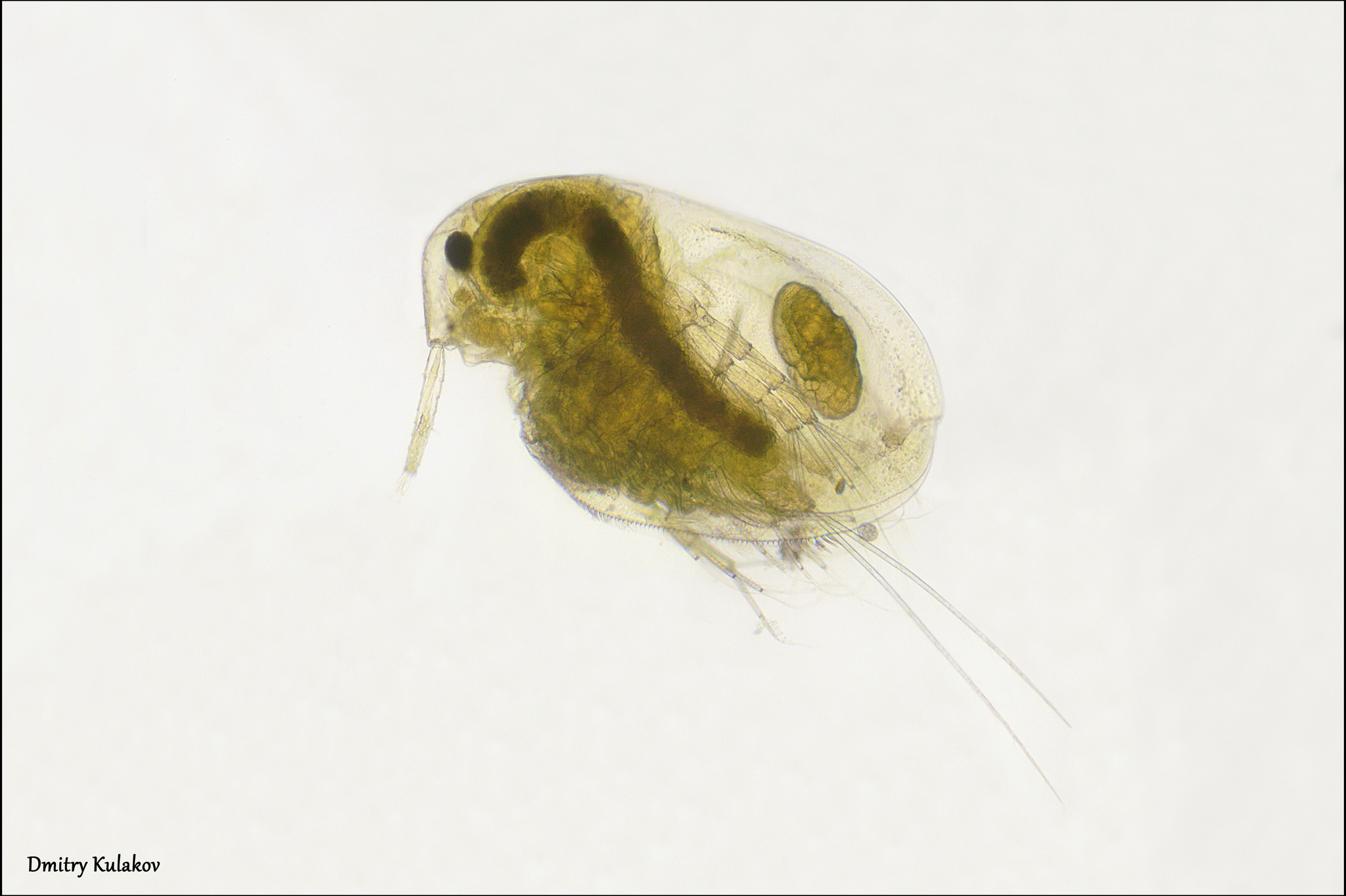
- Lathonura rectirostris

Scientific classification
- Domain: Eukaryota
- Kingdom: Animalia
- Phylum: Arthropoda
- Class: Branchiopoda
- Order: Anomopoda
- Family: Macrothricidae; Norman & Brady, 1867

= Macrothricidae =

Family of arthropods

Macrothricidae is a family of anomopods in the order Diplostraca. There are about 17 genera and at least 80 described species in Macrothricidae.

ITIS Taxonomic note:

- Based on "prevailing use," as permitted under the ICZN (1999), Martin & Davis retain the traditional spelling Macrothricidae over the 'correct' spelling (Macrotrichidae).

== Genera ==
- Acantholeberis Lilljeborg, 1853
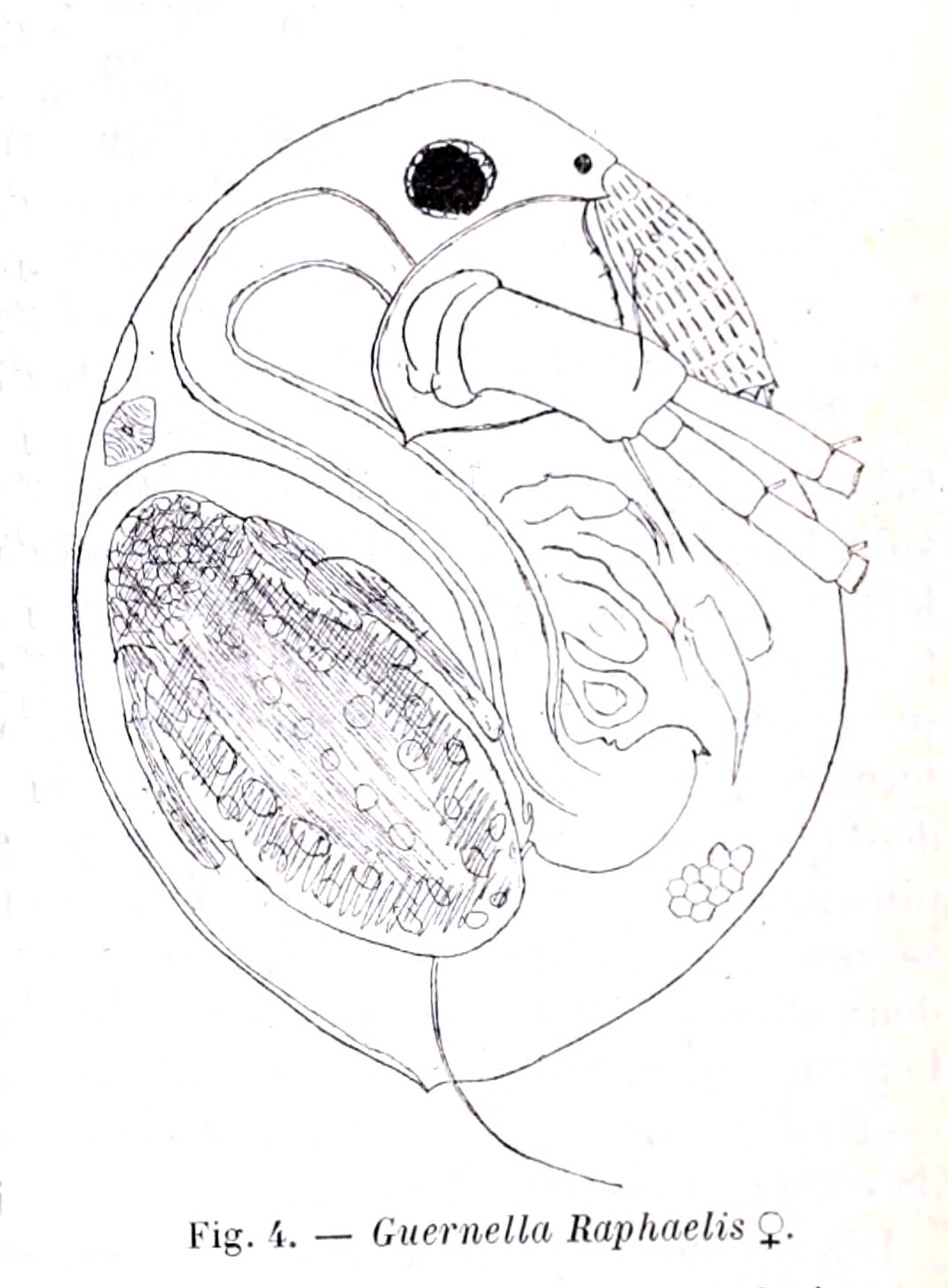
- A diagram of Gurnella raphaelis.
  Bunops Birge, 1893
- Cactus Vávra, 1900
- Drepanothrix G. O. Sars, 1862
- Echinisca
- Grimaldina Richard, 1892
- Guernella Richard, 1892
- Iheringula
- Lathonura Lilljeborg, 1853
- Macrothrix Baird, 1843
- Onchobunops
- Ophryoxus G. O. Sars, 1861
- Parophryoxus Doolittle, 1909
- Pseudomoina
- Streblocerus G. O. Sars, 1862
- Wlassicsia Daday, 1904
- Wlassiscia
