= Acantholeberis =

Scientific classification
- Kingdom: Animalia
- Phylum: Arthropoda
- Clade: Pancrustacea
- Class: Branchiopoda
- Order: Anomopoda
- Family: Acantholeberidae; Smirnov, 1976
- Genus: Acantholeberis; Lilljeborg, 1853

Type species
- Daphnia curvirostris Müller, 1776

Species
- 2–3 species (see text)

Genus of water fleas

Acantholeberis is a genus of cladoceran crustaceans in the monotypic family Acantholeberidae. They occur in freshwater environments in the Neotropical and Holarctic realms.

== Species ==
There are two to three recognized species:

- Acantholeberis curvirostris (Müller, 1776)
- Acantholeberis accolismaris Sousa, Elmoor-Loureiro & Álvarez-Silva, 2022
- Acantholeberis smirnovi Paggi & Herrera-Martinez, 2020

Species Acantholeberis dentata Eurén, 1861 is now accepted as Drepanothrix dentata.
