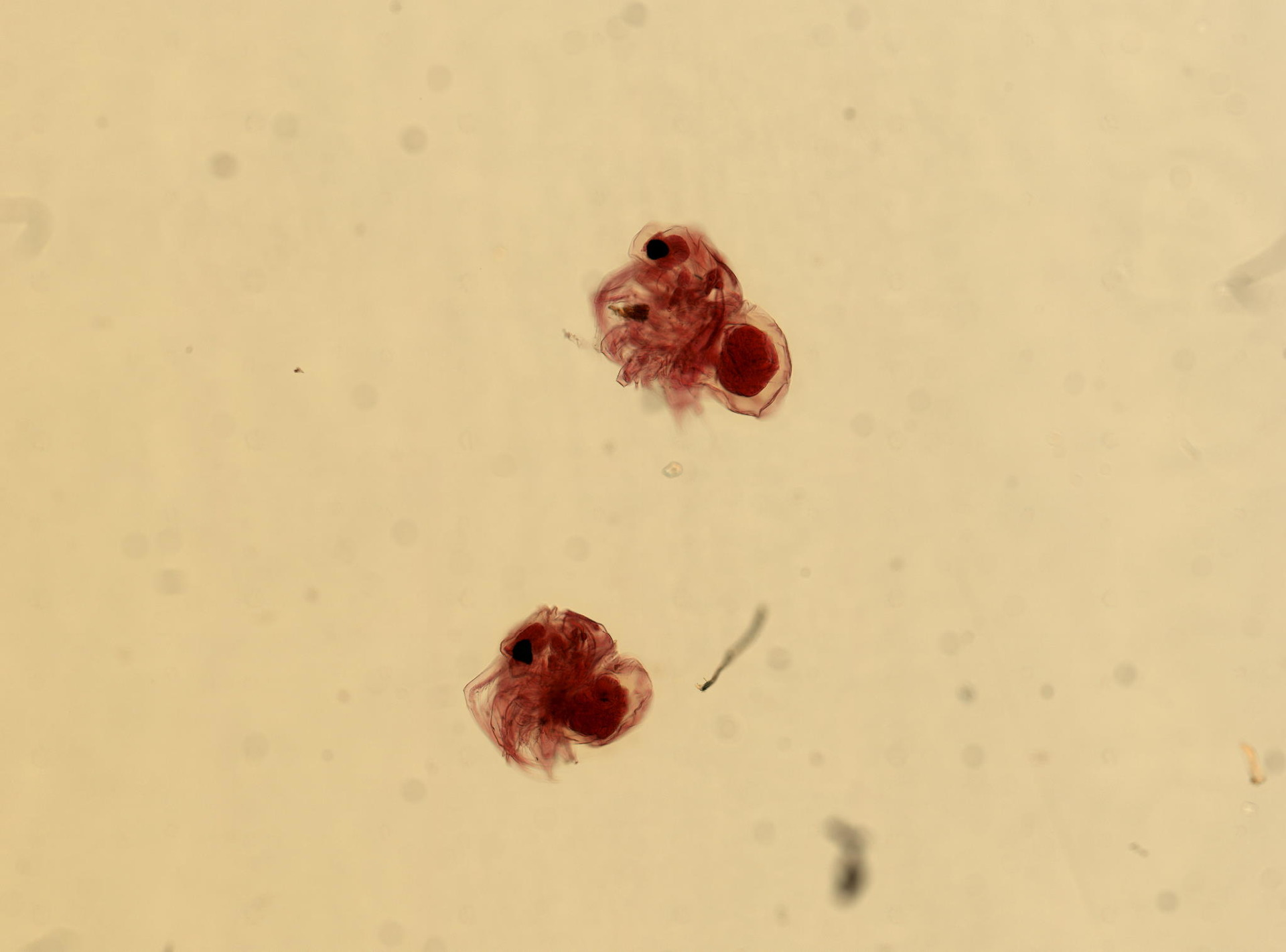
- Podon leuckartii

Scientific classification
- Domain: Eukaryota
- Kingdom: Animalia
- Phylum: Arthropoda
- Class: Branchiopoda
- Order: Onychopoda
- Family: Podonidae
- Genus: Podon; Lilljeborg, 1853

= Podon =

Genus of small freshwater animals

Podon is a genus of onychopods in the family Podonidae. There are at least four described species in Podon.

== Species ==
These four species belong to the genus Podon:

- Podon intermedius Lilljeborg, 1853
- Podon leuckarti (Sars, 1862)
- Podon leuckartii (G. O. Sars, 1862)
- Podon schmackeri Poppe, 1889
