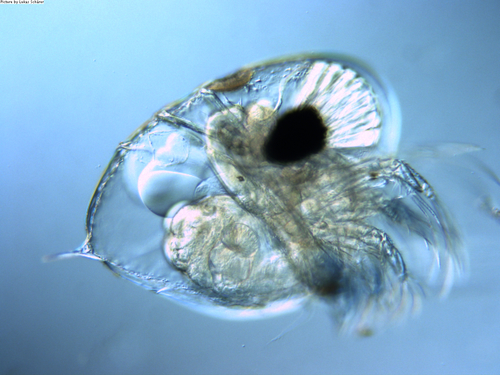

Scientific classification
- Domain: Eukaryota
- Kingdom: Animalia
- Phylum: Arthropoda
- Class: Branchiopoda
- Order: Onychopoda
- Family: Podonidae
- Genus: Evadne
- Species: E. spinifera

Binomial name
- Evadne spinifera P. E. Müller, 1867

= Evadne spinifera =

Species of water flea

Evadne spinifera is a species of water flea in the genus Evadne, within the family Podonidae. It is a small crustacean that inhabits freshwater and brackish water environments. Evadne spinifera is characterized by its spiny body, an identifying feature contributing to its species name 'spinifera'.

== Description ==
Evadne spinifera is oval shaped and generally transparent, with a prominent compound eye. The female of the species is generally larger than the male, measuring .7 to 1.4 mm in length, whereas the male measures .6 to 1.3 mm in length.

== Range and habitat ==
This species is found worldwide, except for sub-polar waters, including shallow freshwater ponds, lakes, and brackish coastal waters. Evadne spinifera is able to thrive in environments with low to moderate salinity. They can be found from sea-level to a depth of 2000 meters, but are likely more common in shallow water.

== Diet ==
Evadne spinifera is a filter feeder, consuming plankton and detritus approximately 20 and 170 μm. It uses its appendages to capture and consume microorganisms and organic matter.

== Reproduction ==
Evadne spinifera exhibits both asexual and sexual reproduction. Under favorable environmental conditions, it reproduces asexually through parthenogenesis, producing clones of itself. In harsh conditions, it can reproduce sexually, producing resting eggs (ephippia) that can survive adverse conditions. The embryos can be seen and counted just before release from the brood pouch.

== Ecological role ==
As a filter feeder, Evadne spinifera plays a role in maintaining water quality by removing excess organic matter. It also serves as a food source for other aquatic organisms, including smaller fish and other invertebrates.
