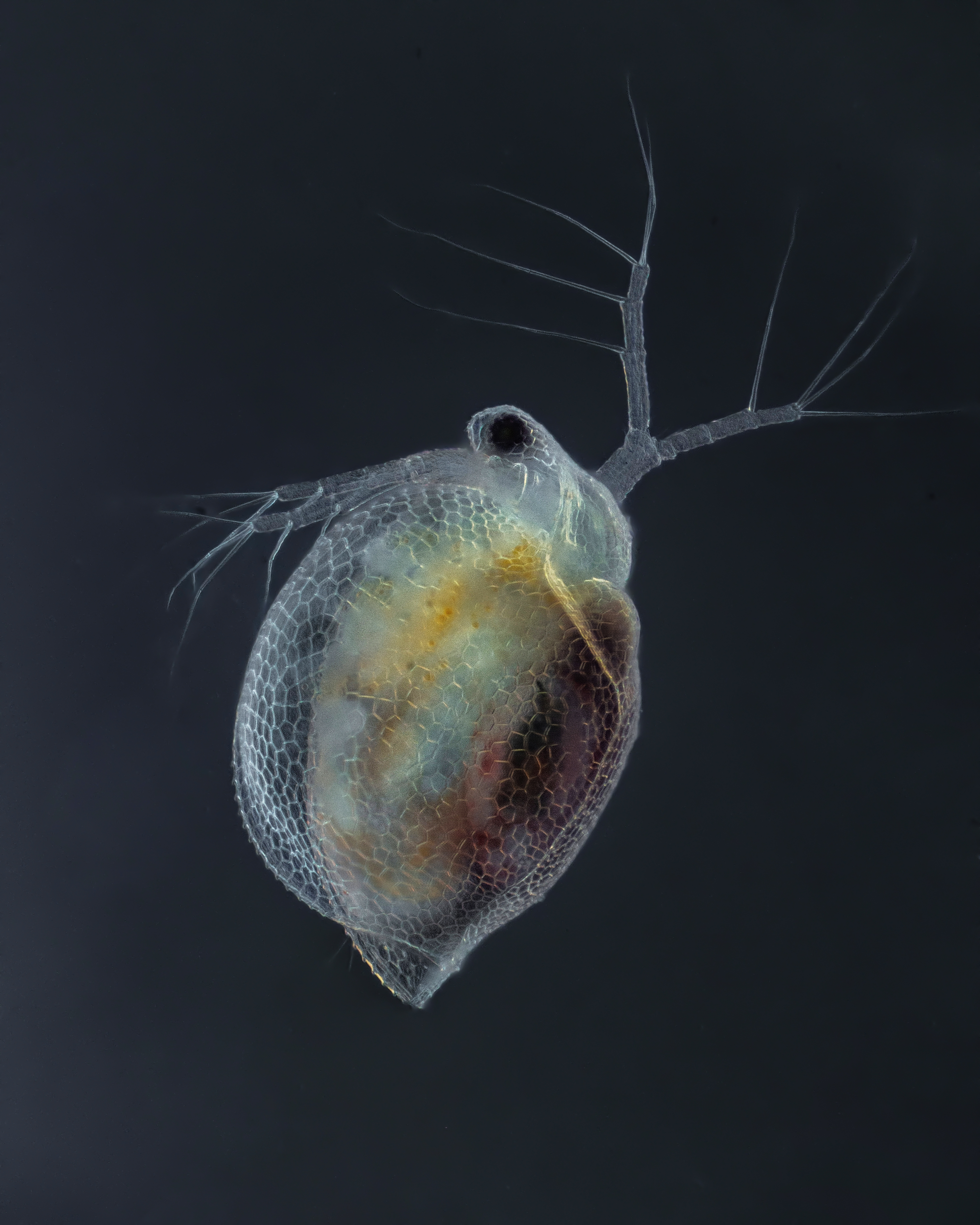

Scientific classification
- Domain: Eukaryota
- Kingdom: Animalia
- Phylum: Arthropoda
- Class: Branchiopoda
- Order: Anomopoda
- Family: Daphniidae
- Genus: Ceriodaphnia; Dana, 1853

= Ceriodaphnia =

Genus of small freshwater animals

Ceriodaphnia is a genus of the Daphniidae; the genus was described in 1853 by James Dwight Dana. It has cosmopolitan distribution.

Species:

- Ceriodaphnia dubia (Richard, 1894)
- Ceriodaphnia quadrangula (O.F. Müller, 1785)
- Ceriodaphnia reticulata (Jurine, 1820)
