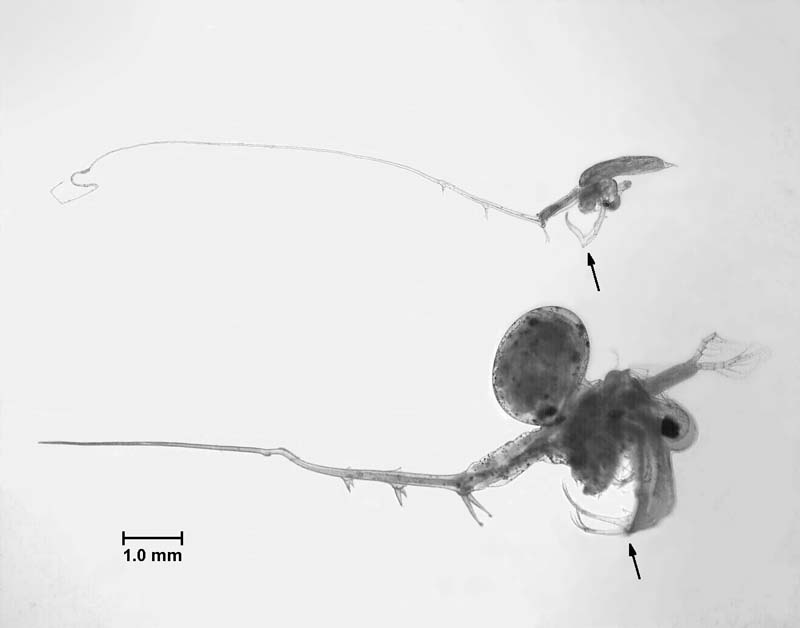
- The spiny water flea (below), and the fishhook waterflea (above)

Scientific classification
- Kingdom: Animalia
- Phylum: Arthropoda
- Clade: Pancrustacea
- Class: Branchiopoda
- Order: Onychopoda
- Family: Cercopagididae
- Genus: Bythotrephes
- Species: B. longimanus

Binomial name
- Bythotrephes longimanus (Leydig, 1860)

Synonyms
- Bythotrephes cederstroemi

= Bythotrephes longimanus =

Spiny water flea

Bythotrephes longimanus (also Bythotrephes cederstroemi), or the spiny water flea, is a planktonic crustacean less than 15 millimetres (0.6 in) long. It is native to fresh waters of Northern Europe and Asia, but has been accidentally introduced and widely distributed in the Great Lakes area of North America since the 1980s. Bythotrephes is typified by a long abdominal spine with several barbs which protect it from predators.

== Description and taxonomy ==
Bythotrephes longimanus is a cladoceran crustacean (water flea) recognizable with its straight tail spine averaging about 70% of its length. Adult individuals have one to three pairs of barbs on the spine, while juveniles have only one pair. The females grow to become 8 times larger than the males. The animal has one large eye that is usually black or red. It also possesses a pair of swimming antennae and four pairs of legs, of which the first pair is used to catch prey. Mandibles are used for consumption of prey.

The spiny water flea is similar to another introduced Cladoceran of the same family, the fishhook water flea Cercopagis pengoi, which, however, has a more slender spine featuring a prominent loop-like hook at its end (see figure). There is also variation in the shape of the more robust spine of Bythotrephes itself. Specimens arising from sexual reproduction have a completely straight and relatively shorter spine. In parthenogenetically produced animals, the spine features a kink in the middle (see figure). Previously, the kinked-spined animals were thought to be a separate species – Bythotrephes cederstroemi. After genetic analysis, it is now considered to be a form of B. longimanus, making Bythotrephes a monotypic genus, (one with only a single species). The results of the genetic study (two mitochondrial, and two nuclear genes) strongly support the hypothesis of a single species — Bythotrephes longimanus Leydig, 1860, and ecological morphs should be accepted as junior synonyms. This also elucidates the very recent radiation of Bythotrephes, which may have begun rapidly and parallel during the Late Pleistocene, or even after the last glaciation. A comprehensive biogeographic reconstruction of Bythotrephes dispersal within the Holarctic realm. Europe likely served as a dispersal centre for Bythotrephes from where they spread relatively recently (possibly, less than 10 kyr) and we distinguish five possible dispersal events in its evolutionary history.

== Diet ==
The spiny water flea preys on smaller planktonic organisms. Its diet consists mostly of zooplankton, including Daphnia and smaller crustaceans. Bythotrephes can consume 10–20 prey organisms a day. It may also eat other small organisms it comes across.

== Geographical range ==
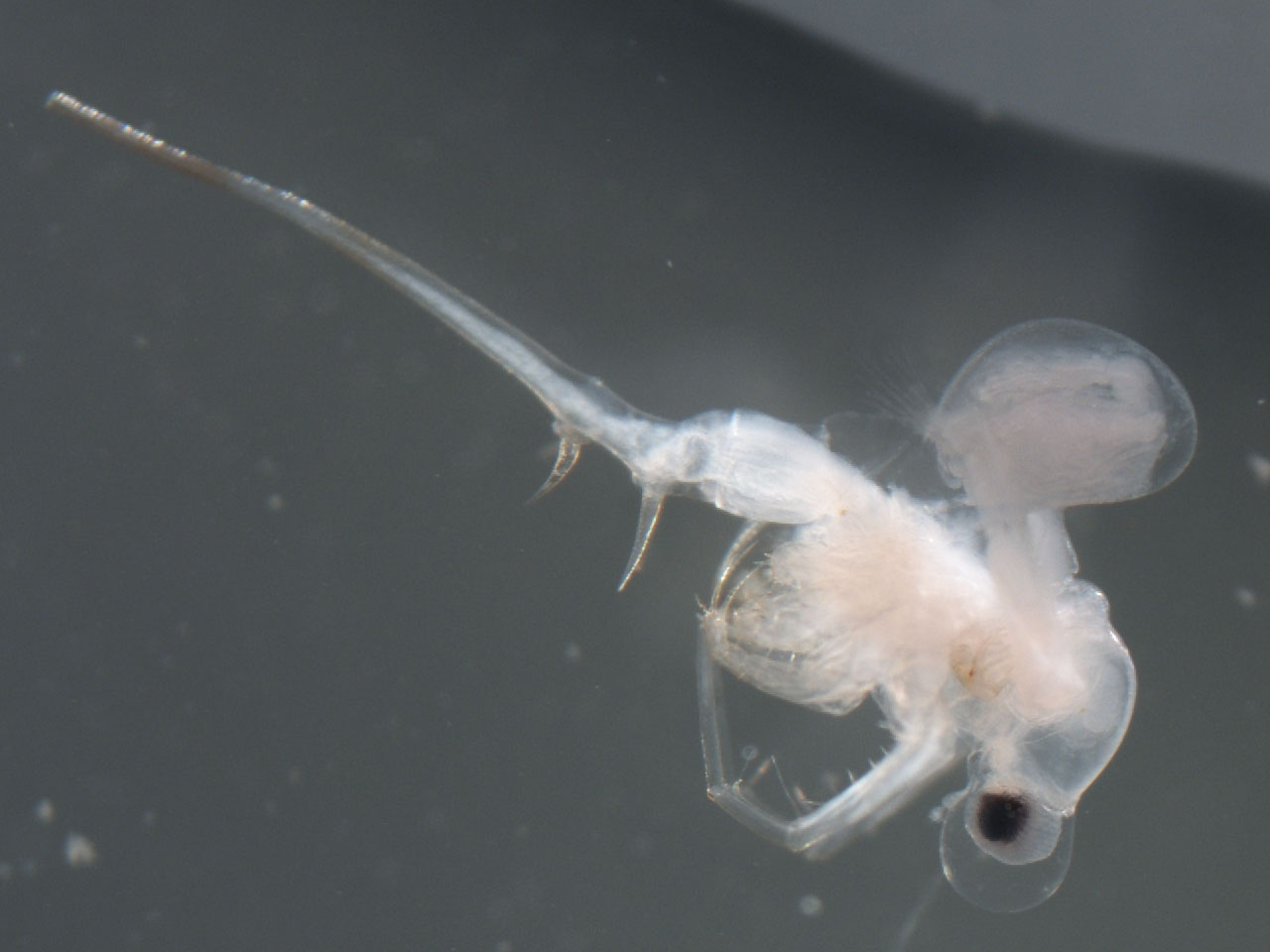

The spiny water flea is native to northern Europe and Asia, and some parts of central Europe. However, the water flea has spread in recent years to many areas throughout Europe, including some ports and inland lakes outside its natural range.

In 1982, the crustacean was found in Lake Ontario, and soon spread to the other Great Lakes and some inland lakes within the Midwest, including over 60 inland lakes in Ontario. It is thought to have been introduced by untreated ballast water from international ships. Concern has increased to the impact of this invasive species in the Great Lakes region and other areas it might have been accidentally introduced. The spiny water flea, eggs and larvae may be caught up in fishing line, down-riggers, fishing nets, and other fishing equipment, which has caused the spread of the water flea to inland lakes and rivers.

== Impact in introduced areas ==
Bythotrephes competes with several fish, including panfish and perch, for prey. It has been suggested that very small larval fish are not able to feed on the spiny water flea itself because of the barbs the flea possesses, but it is readily consumed by several fish species once the fish are larger. The spiny water flea's diet consists mostly of Daphnia zooplankton, leading to competition with small and baby fish, and also with native water flea species. Daphnia zooplankton populations have declined in recent years, though there is no conclusive evidence as to the cause.

The spiny water flea is causing serious concerns about the lakes of Canada, with the problem being that it feeds on zooplankton and can actually eliminate zooplankton species. As zooplankton is the backbone of aquatic food chains, this tiny crustacean presents a serious risk to the ecosystem. The eggs survive even after being dried out or eaten by fish.

Invasion by the spiny water flea has also correlated with ecological changes in the Great Lakes. Since the species' introduction to the Great Lakes in the mid-1980s, there has been a decrease in species richness, as well as decreases in the late summer densities of several other Cladocera species, including Daphnia pulicaria and Daphnia retrocurva.
