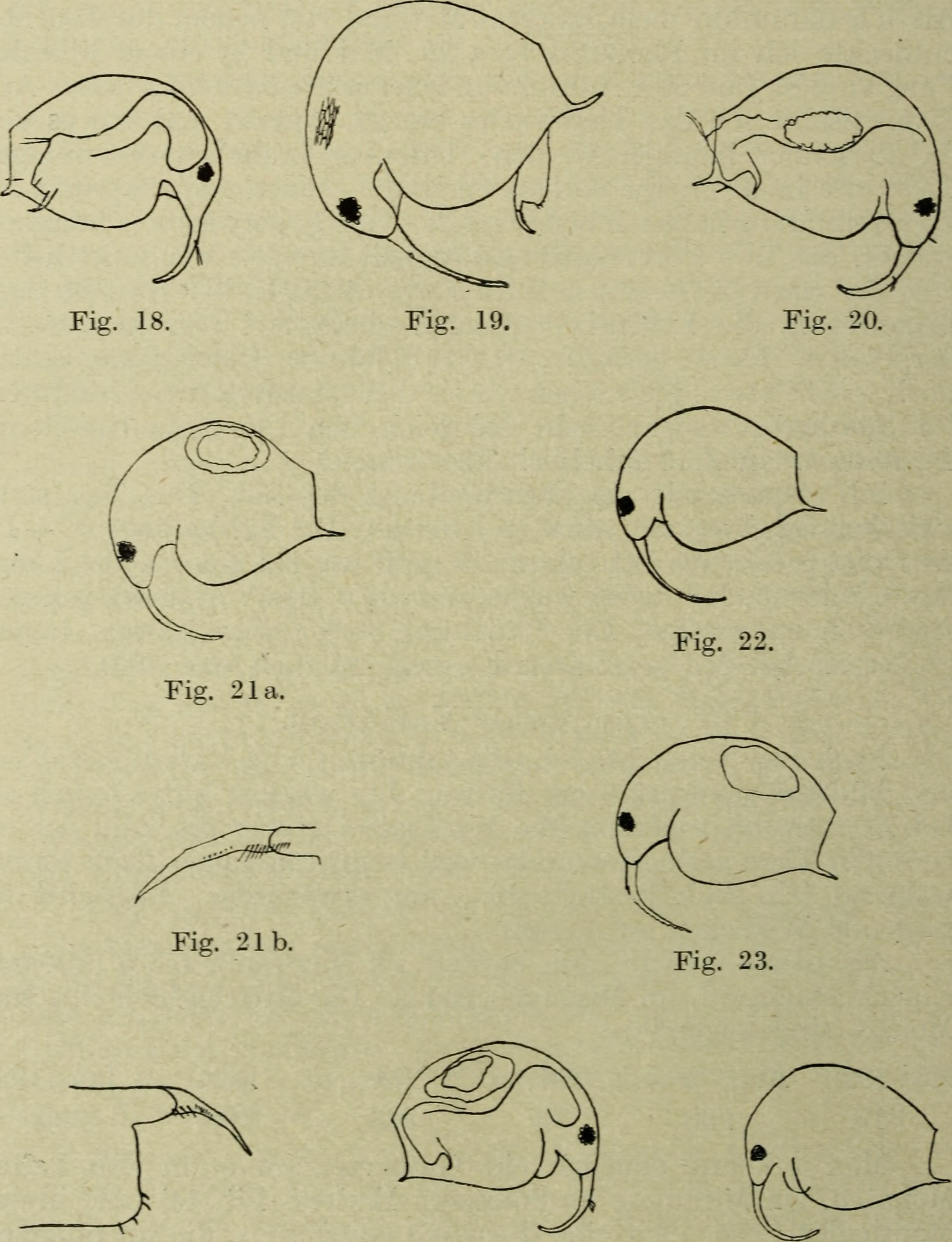

Scientific classification
- Kingdom: Animalia
- Phylum: Arthropoda
- Clade: Pancrustacea
- Class: Branchiopoda
- Order: Anomopoda
- Family: Bosminidae
- Genus: Bosmina; Baird, 1845

= Bosmina =

Genus of small freshwater animals

Bosmina is a genus of water fleas. Its members can be distinguished from those of Bosminopsis (the only other genus in the family Bosminidae) by the separation of the antennae; in Bosminopsis, the antennae are fused at their bases.

Bosmina occur in both marine, brackish, and freshwater environments. They are filter feeders consuming algae and protozoans about 1–3 μm long. Bosmina are known to have a dual feeding mechanism. They can filter the water using their second and third legs and the first leg will grab the particles. The second and third legs have small setules attached to the seta to make a mesh-like structure for filtering.

Some Bosmina species are non-native species, many of which pose a great threat to aquatic ecosystems.

== Species list ==
There are 28 accepted species:

Subgenus Bosmina Baird, 1845

- Bosmina atlantaensis Turner, 1894
- Bosmina freyi De Melo & Hebert, 1994
- Bosmina liederi De Melo & Hebert, 1994
- Bosmina longirostris (O.F. Müller, 1785)

Subgenus Eubosmina Seligo, 1900

- Bosmina arctica Wesenberg-Lund, 1894
- Bosmina coregoni Baird, 1857
- Bosmina crassicornis Lilljeborg, 1887
- Bosmina striata Herrick, 1882
- Bosmina tanakai Kotov, Ishida & Taylor, 2009

Subgenus Liederobosmina Brtek, 1997

- Bosmina brehmi Lieder, 1962
- Bosmina chilensis Daday, 1902
- Bosmina hagmanni Stingelin, 1904
- Bosmina huaronensis Delachaux, 1918
- Bosmina macrostyla Daday, 1905
- Bosmina meridionalis G.O. Sars, 1904
- Bosmina tubicen Brehm, 1953

Subgenus Lunobosmina Taylor, Ishikane & Haney, 2002

- Bosmina oriens De Melo & Hebert, 1994

Subgenus Sinobosmina Lieder, 1957

- Bosmina fatalis Burckhardt, 1924
- Bosmina tripurae Kořínek, Saha & Bhattacharya, 1999

Subgenus unassigned

- Bosmina globosa Lilljeborg, 1901
- Bosmina janoviensis Dybowski & Grochiwski, 1895
- Bosmina longinensis Schödler, 1865
- Bosmina macrorhyncha Leydig, 1860
- Bosmina macrorhynchus (Schmarda, 1854)
- Bosmina minima Keilhack, 1908
- Bosmina rectirostris Schödler, 1866
- Bosmina sarsi Schödler, 1864
- Bosmina similis G.O. Sars, 1890
