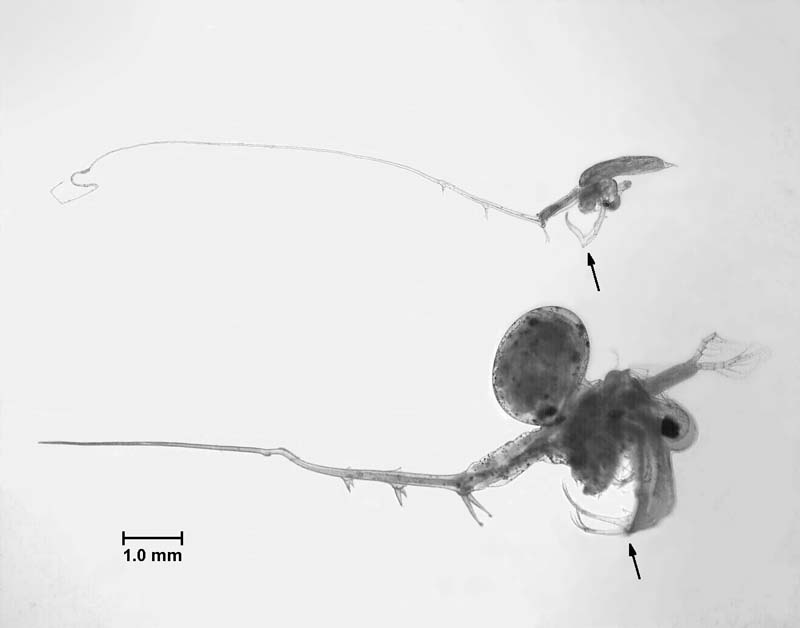
- Cercopagis pengoi (above, total length 10 mm) and Bythotrephes longimanus (below)

Scientific classification
- Kingdom: Animalia
- Phylum: Arthropoda
- Clade: Pancrustacea
- Class: Branchiopoda
- Subclass: Phyllopoda
- Superorder: Diplostraca
- Order: Onychopoda
- Family: Cercopagididae
- Genus: Cercopagis
- Species: C. pengoi

Binomial name
- Cercopagis pengoi (Ostroumov, 1891)

Synonyms
- Cercopagis (Apagis) ossiani

= Cercopagis pengoi =

Species of small freshwater animal

Cercopagis pengoi, or the fishhook waterflea, is a species of planktonic cladoceran crustaceans that is native in the brackish fringes of the Black Sea and the Caspian Sea. In recent decades it has spread as an invasive species to some freshwater waterways and reservoirs of Eastern Europe and to the brackish Baltic Sea. Further it was introduced in ballast water to the Great Lakes of North America and a number of adjacent lakes, and has become a pest classified among the 100 worst invasive species of the world.

Cercopagis pengoi is a predatory cladoceran and thus a competitor to other planktivorous invertebrates and smaller fishes. On the other hand, it has provided a new food source for planktivorous fishes. It is also a nuisance to fisheries as it tends to clog nets and fishing gear.

== Description ==
The length of Cercopagis pengoi body is 1–3 mm, but with the tail included they range from 6–13 mm. The size varies with location, the largest are found in the Baltic Sea (average body size 2.0 mm) and smallest in Lake Ontario (average size 1.4 mm). The English name refers to the three pairs of barbs and a characteristic loop at the end of the tail.

== Ecology ==
Cercopagis pengoi is eurythermal and euryhaline, being able to tolerate a wide range of temperature and salinity. It is a pelagic species, found in a higher abundance further from the shore and from the bottom. It is a generalist feeder which preys on various species in both micro- and mesozooplankton (i.e. cladocerans, copepods, rotifers). The size of prey ranges from its own body size to seventeen times smaller. Prey is captured using thoracopods I, then retained by thoracopods II-IV, and crushed by its cuticle by mandibles, finally C. pengoi sucks the prey body contents.

Fishhook waterfleas reproduce asexually during the summer, which produces a quick rise in population. When conditions are inhospitable, C. pengoi will undergo sexual reproduction, producing resting eggs that can over-winter and repopulate the lake quickly in the spring. Resting eggs can withstand desiccation (extreme dryness), freeze-drying, and ingestion by fish.

== Invasive species ==
Cercopagis pengoi was brought to the American Great Lakes in ship ballast water from the Black Sea. It has been documented in Lake Ontario (1998), Lake Erie (2002), Lake Huron (2002), Lake Michigan (1999), the Finger Lakes of New York (Canandaigua, Cayuga, Keuka, Cross, Otisco, Owasco, and Seneca lakes, and the NYCDEP Pepacton Reservoir (2024). The species is transported in the live wells, bait water, and ropes of recreational fishing and boating. C. pengoi’s wide tolerance levels and ability to reproduce both sexually and asexually makes it a very successful invader. Asexual reproduction allows for rapid population growth, and then resting eggs which are produced sexually can stick to boats and fishing gear and dispersed into new bodies of water.

In the Baltic and in the Great Lakes, planktivorous fish and mysids are reported to prey on C. pengoi, implying that it has become a new food source. C. pengoi directly competes with native zooplanktivores like alewife and rainbow smelt. Furthermore, C. pengoi have a long spine which deters planktivorous fish from consuming them. These factors cause disruption in the lower trophic levels of the Great Lakes food web which can eventually trickle up the food chain to cause problems with fish stock through a trophic cascade.

=== Control strategies ===
There is no known method of eradication or control for invasive Cercopagis pengoi. Containing the spread to new areas is the only form of management. Stricter ballast water regulations and awareness would prevent the spread. The C. pengoi invasion of the Great Lakes occurred after the United States passed a regulation requiring ships exchange freshwater ballast water with ocean water to kill off potential invaders. This means that either the resting eggs remain viable even after boats filled with ballast water switch out their ballast water in the ocean, or the required ballast water regulations are not being followed, or the species was brought into the Great Lakes in no-ballast-on-board (NOBOB) vessels (the most like possibility). NOBOB vessels carry only residual water (<50000L) but were not required to exchange ballast water at the time of Cercopagis' invasion.

Locally C. pengoi spread can be limited by only releasing bait or bait water into the water body where the bait was originally collected. Boat owners should wash their boats and equipment with high pressure and hot water (above 40 °C) to limit the spread of adult C. pengoi. Alternatively boats and equipment should be allowed to dry for at least five days before moving to another body of water.
