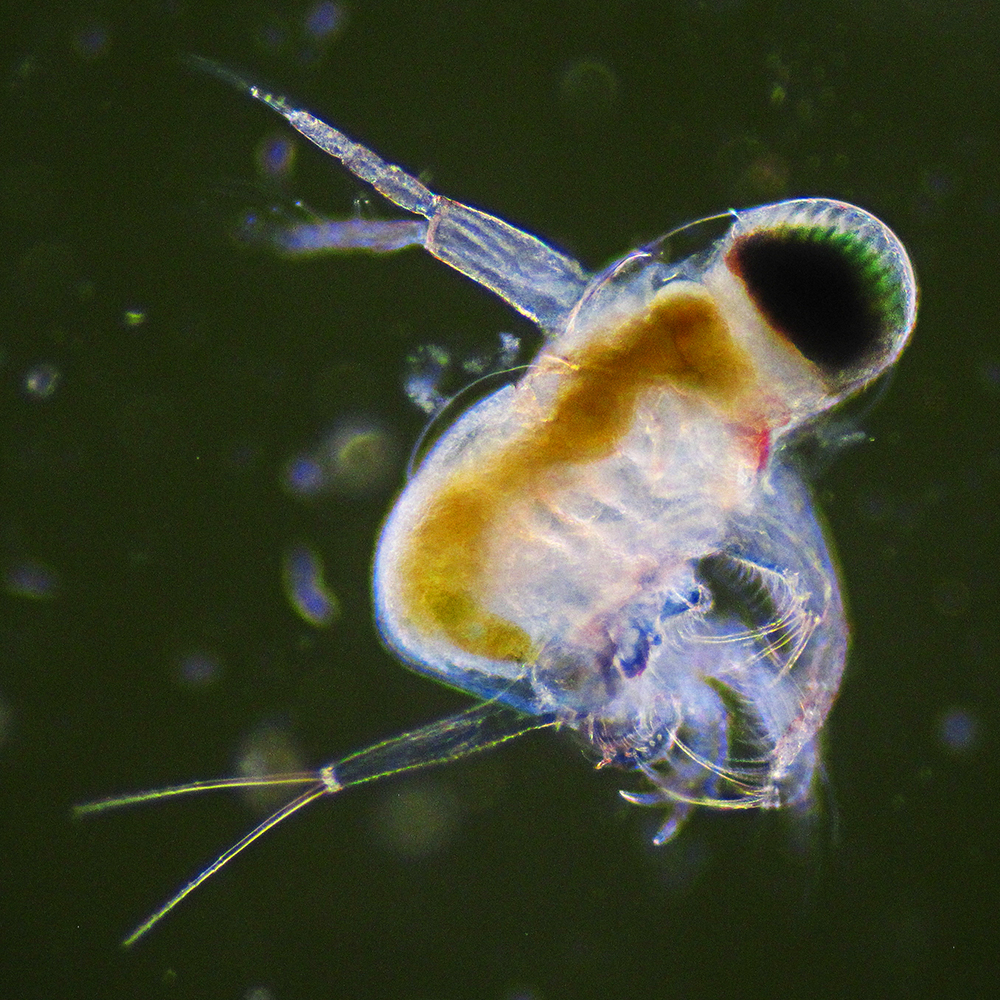
- Polyphemus pediculus

Scientific classification
- Domain: Eukaryota
- Kingdom: Animalia
- Phylum: Arthropoda
- Class: Branchiopoda
- Subclass: Phyllopoda
- Superorder: Diplostraca
- Order: Onychopoda
- Family: Polyphemidae; Baird, 1845
- Genus: Polyphemus; O. F. Müller, 1785

Species
- Polyphemus exiguus G. O. Sars, 1897; Polyphemus pediculus (Linnaeus, 1761)

= Polyphemus (crustacean) =

Genus of small freshwater animals

Polyphemus is a genus of water fleas, and the only genus in the family Polyphemidae. There are two species, P. exiguus and P. pediculus, although allopatric speciation has resulted in a number of cryptic species of P. pediculus. Polyphemus exiguus inhabits open zones in the Caspian Sea, while Polyphemus pediculus exists throughout the Holarctic. It lives in diverse conditions, from small ponds to lakes and estuaries such as the Gulf of Saint Lawrence and the Gulf of Finland. It can be found quite far offshore.

Polyphemus are a predatory genus of water flea. The two species have four pairs of legs with exopodites, or outer branches. The legs are adapted for catching mobile prey, generally smaller species of water flea such as young Daphnia and Bosmina.

Polyphemus has two compound eyes that are fused to form a single unit, with a zoned set of receptors. This zoned structure is paired with an eye-control system that allows the Polyphemus to visually distinguish target size to avoid predators and track prey. P. pediculus is approximately 1 millimetre (0.04 in) in length. P. exiguus, while similar in morphology, is smaller.
