= Wilhelm Lilljeborg =

Swedish zoologist

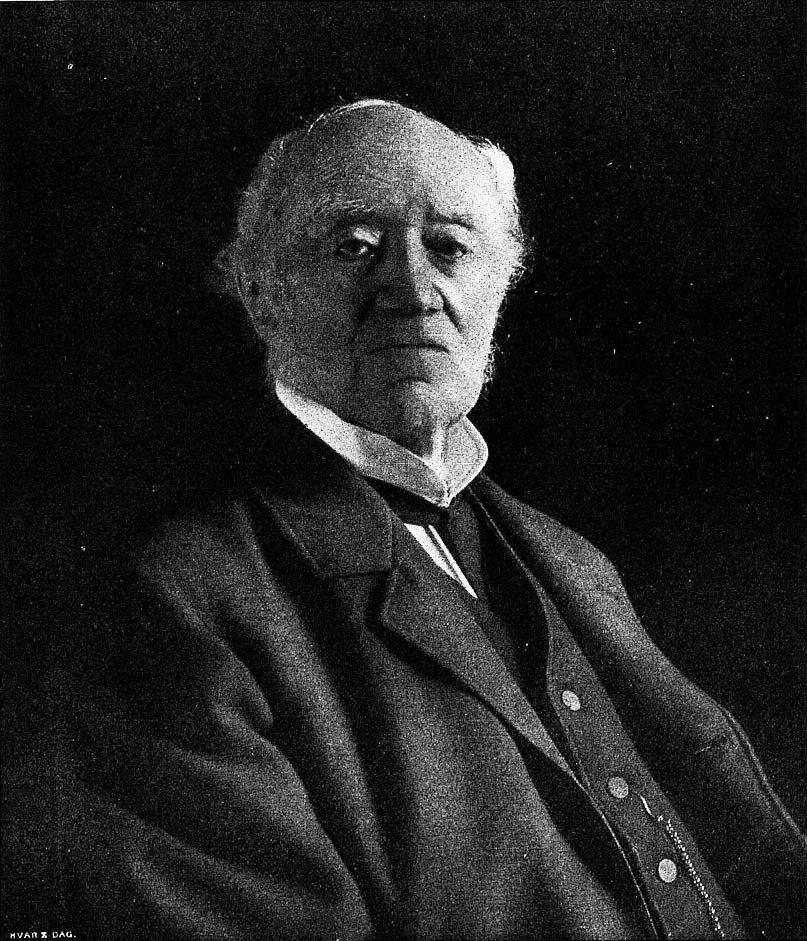
Vilhelm Lilljeborg

Wilhelm Lilljeborg (6 October 1816 – 24 July 1908) was a Swedish zoologist. He is particularly known for his work on the Cladocera of Sweden, and on the Balaenoptera. Lilljeborg was a member of the Royal Swedish Academy of Sciences from 1861.
