= Gondwanothrix =

Scientific classification
- Domain: Eukaryota
- Kingdom: Animalia
- Phylum: Arthropoda
- Class: Branchiopoda
- Order: Anomopoda
- Family: Gondwanothrichidae; Van Damme, Shiel & Dumont, 2007
- Genus: Gondwanothrix; Van Damme, Shiel & Dumont, 2007
- Species: G. halsei

Binomial name
- Gondwanothrix halsei (Van Damme, Shiel & Dumont, 2007)

Genus of small freshwater animals

Gondwanothrix halsei is a species of small crustaceans (ca. 1.0–1.3 millimetres or 0.039–0.051 inches) within the order Anomopoda, placed in its own family, Gondwanotrichidae. It exists in a macrotrichid habitus found in humic coastal dune lakes and swamps in southwest Western Australia. The species' type locality is Angove Lake in the Two Peoples Bay Nature Reserve (34°56′32″S 118°9′54″E).
