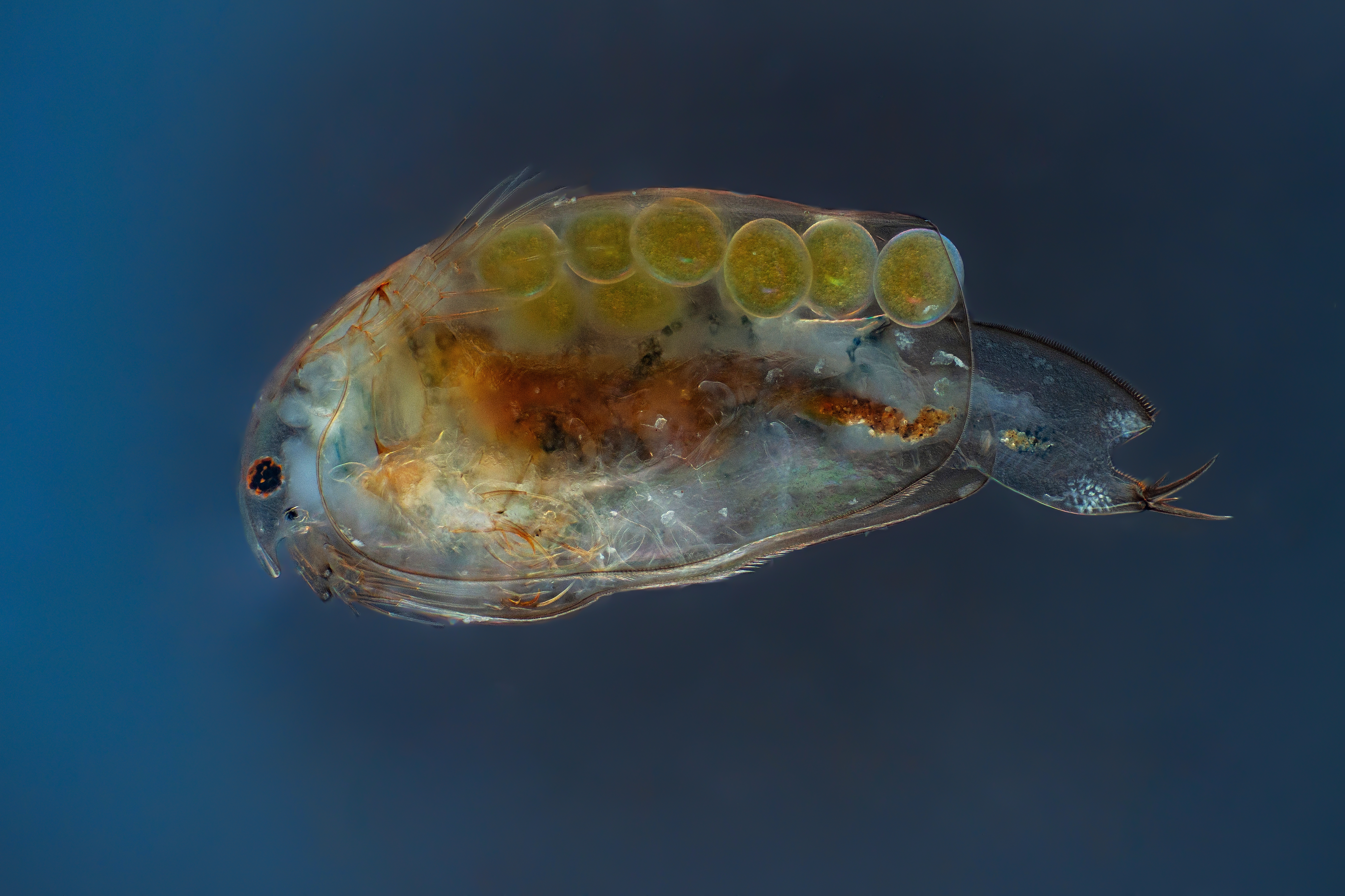
- Eurycercus lamellatus

Scientific classification
- Domain: Eukaryota
- Kingdom: Animalia
- Phylum: Arthropoda
- Class: Branchiopoda
- Order: Anomopoda
- Family: Eurycercidae; Kurz, 1875
- Genus: Eurycercus; Baird, 1843

Species
- 16 species (see text)

= Eurycercus =

Genus of crustaceans

Eurycercus is a genus of crustaceans belonging to the suborder Anomopoda. It is the only genus in the monotypic family Eurycercidae. Eurycercus are relatively large anomopods, reaching sizes as large as 6 mm (0.2 in).

== Species ==
There are 16 species:

Subgenus Eurycercus (Bullatifrons) Frey, 1975:

- Eurycercus (Bullatifrons) longirostris Hann, 1982
- Eurycercus (Bullatifrons) macracanthus Frey, 1973
- Eurycercus (Bullatifrons) pompholygodes Frey, 1975
- Eurycercus (Bullatifrons) vernalis Hann, 1982

Subgenus Eurycercus (Eurycercus) Baird, 1843:

- Eurycercus (Eurycercus) lamellatus (O.F. Müller, 1776)
- Eurycercus (Eurycercus) microdontus Frey, 1978

Subgenus Eurycercus (Teretifrons) Frey, 1975:

- Eurycercus (Teretifrons) glacialis Lilljeborg, 1887
- Eurycercus (Teretifrons) nigracanthus Hann, 1990

Subgenus not determined:

- Eurycercus beringi Bekker, Kotov & Taylor, 2012
- Eurycercus cunninghami King, 1853
- Eurycercus lamellatus (O.F. Müller, 1776)
- Eurycercus meridionalis Bekker, Kotov & Elmoor-Loureiro, 2010
- Eurycercus minutus Birabén, 1939
- Eurycercus nipponica Tanaka & Fujita, 2002
- Eurycercus norandinus Aranguren, Monroy & Gaviria, 2010
- Eurycercus spinosus King, 1853
