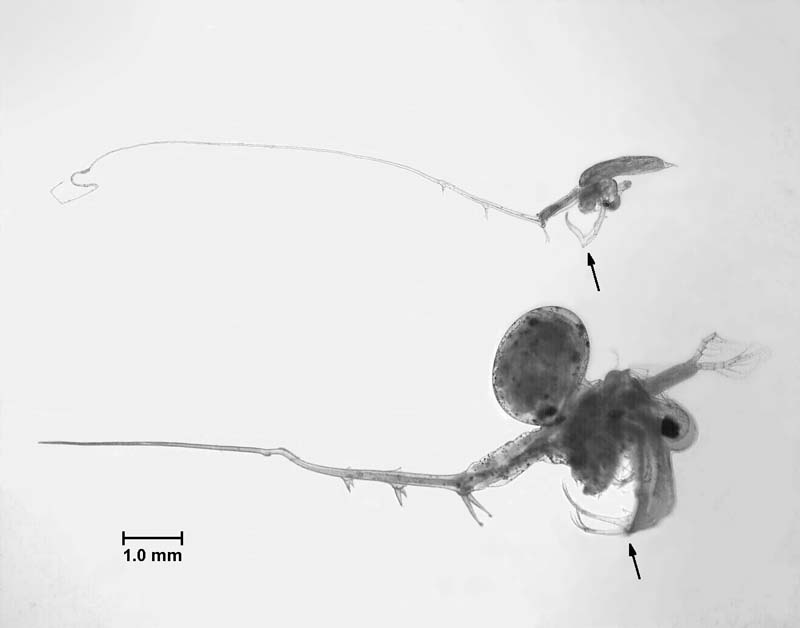
- An example of Cercopagis pengoi

Scientific classification
- Domain: Eukaryota
- Kingdom: Animalia
- Phylum: Arthropoda
- Class: Branchiopoda
- Order: Onychopoda
- Family: Cercopagididae; Mordukhai-Boltovskoi, 1968

= Cercopagididae =

Family of crustaceans

Cercopagididae is a family of crustaceans belonging to the order Diplostraca. A lot of Cercopagididae species are non-native species, many of which pose a great threat to aquatic ecosystems.

Genera:

- Bythotrephes Leydig, 1860 (e.g. Bythotrephes longimanus)
- Cercopagis Sars, 1897 (e.g. Cercopagis pengoi)

In addition, * Apagis Sars, 1897 is sometimes treated as a genus rather than as a subgenus, Cercopagis (Apagis).
