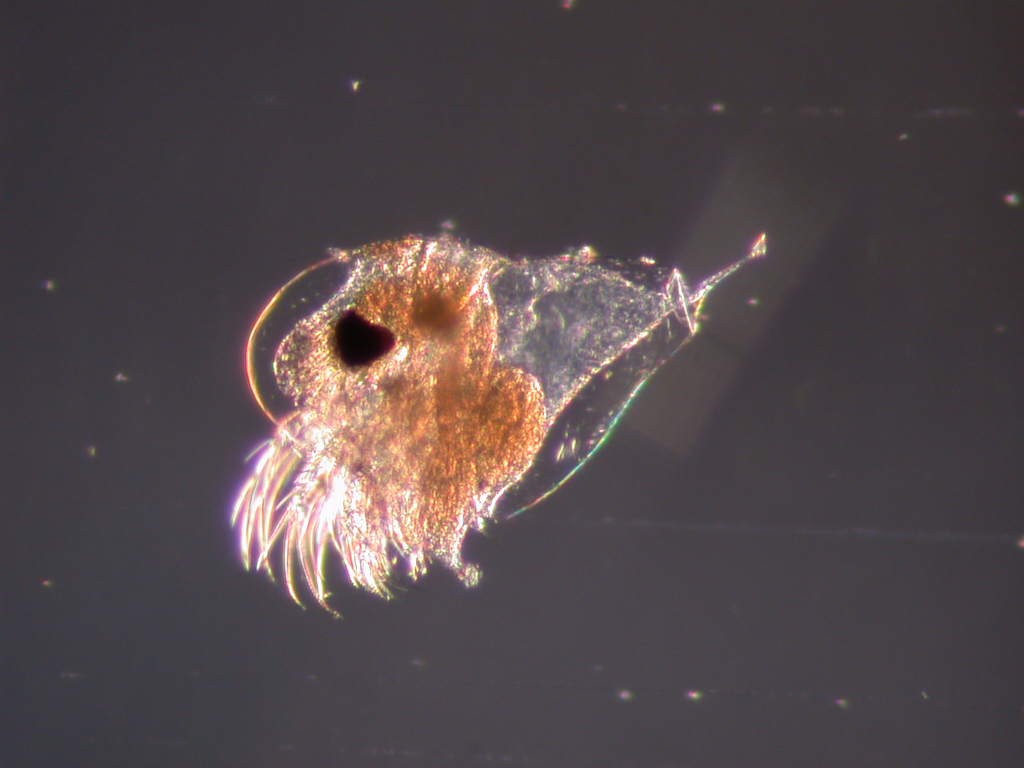
- Evadne spinifera

Scientific classification
- Kingdom: Animalia
- Phylum: Arthropoda
- Clade: Pancrustacea
- Class: Branchiopoda
- Superorder: Diplostraca
- Order: Onychopoda; Sars, 1865

Families
- Cercopagididae Mordukhai-Boltovskoi, 1968; Podonidae Mordukhai-Boltovskoi, 1968; Polyphemidae Baird, 1845

= Onychopoda =

Suborder of small freshwater animals

Onychopoda, from Ancient Greek ὄνυχος (ónukhos), meaning "claw", and πούς poús, meaning "foot", are a specialised order of branchiopod crustaceans, belonging to the superorder Cladocera.

The order Onychopoda is "one of the most morphologically distinctive groups of cladocerans". They have only four pairs of legs, compared to five or six pairs in Ctenopoda and Anomopoda. Unusually among branchiopod crustaceans, Onychopoda share with Haplopoda the presence of segmented appendages, which are used for grasping prey.

Most species of Onychopoda live in the waters of the Ponto-Caspian basin (Caspian Sea, Aral Sea, Black Sea including Sea of Azov), in remnants of the ancient Paratethys ocean. Some other species live in fresh water or in the oceans, where they can be widespread. The Onychopoda have accidentally been introduced to areas outside of their native range.

There are three families, containing 10 genera and around 33 described species, most of which are endemic to the Ponto-Caspian basin:

- Cercopagididae Mordukhai-Boltovskoi, 1968 – 2 genera (Cercopagis and Bythotrephes), 14 species; Black Sea & Caspian Sea
- Podonidae Mordukhai-Boltovskoi, 1968 – 7 genera, 17 species; Pont-Caspian (Caspievadne, Cornigerius and Podonevadne) and marine (Evadne, Pleopis, Podon and Pseudevadne)
- Polyphemidae Baird, 1845 – 1 genus (Polyphemus), 2 species; fresh water

The embryos are protected by a brood pouch, which also secretes nutrients to aid their development. This may be related to the colonisation of the oceans, since the only other marine cladoceran, Penilia avirostris, has a similar pouch as a result of convergent evolution.

== See also ==
- Bythotrephes longimanus
- Cercopagis pengoi
