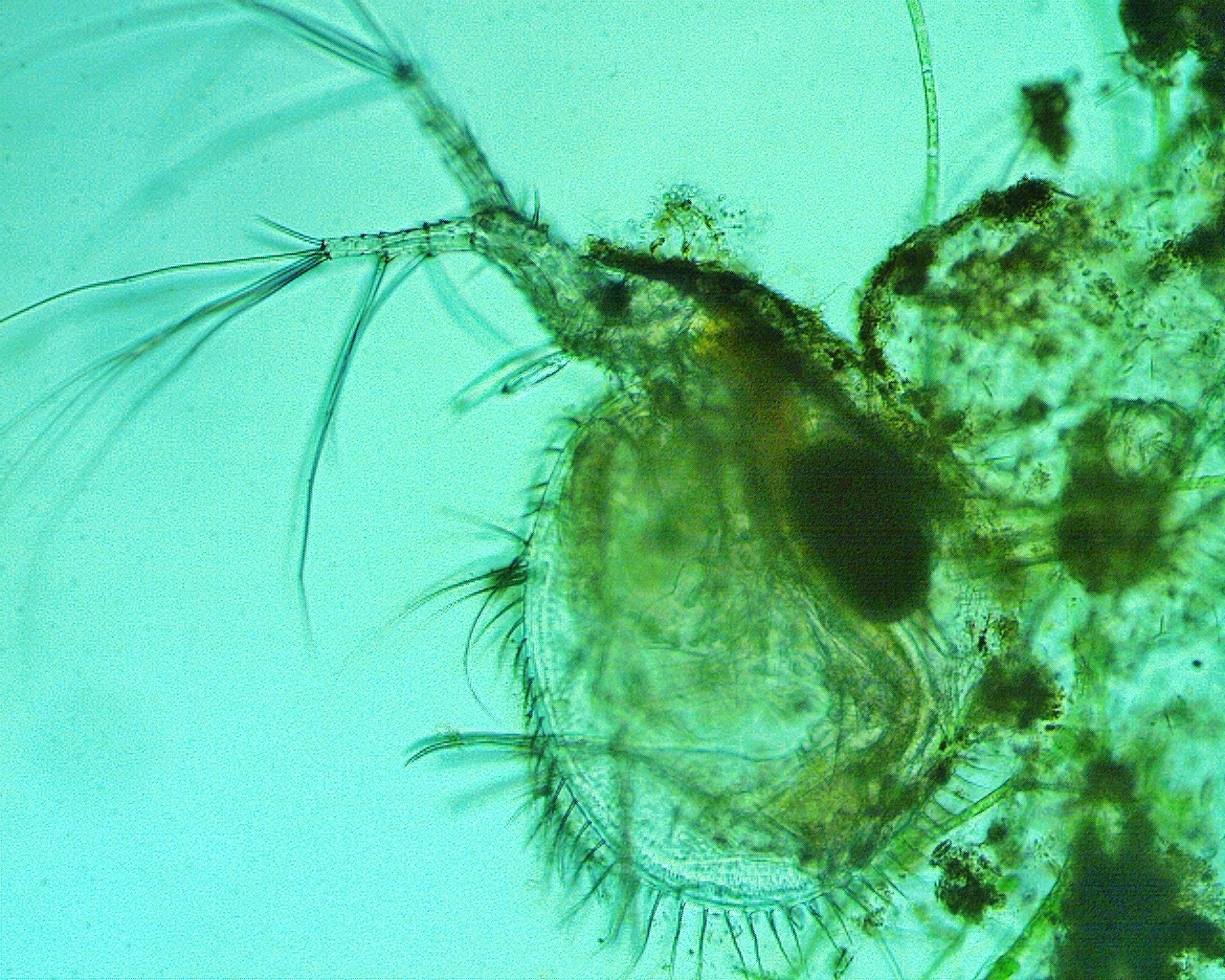
- Ilyocryptus spinifer

Scientific classification
- Kingdom: Animalia
- Phylum: Arthropoda
- Clade: Pancrustacea
- Class: Branchiopoda
- Order: Anomopoda
- Family: Ilyocryptidae; Smirnov, 1976
- Genus: Ilyocryptus; G.O. Sars, 1861

= Ilyocryptus =

Family of water fleas

Ilyocryptus is a genus of water fleas in the order Anomopoda. It is the only genus in the monotypic family Ilyocryptidae.
