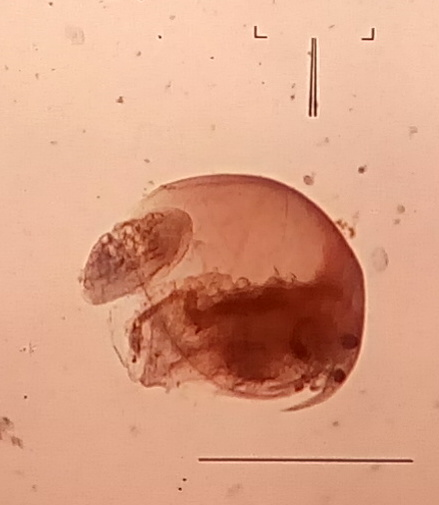
- Bosmina

Scientific classification
- Kingdom: Animalia
- Phylum: Arthropoda
- Class: Branchiopoda
- Order: Anomopoda
- Family: Bosminidae; Baird, 1845

= Bosminidae =

Family of small freshwater animals

Bosminidae is a family of anomopods in the order Diplostraca. There are at least three genera and 40 described species in Bosminidae. Some Bosminidae have accidentally been introduced by humans to areas outside of their native range.

== Genera ==
- Bosmina Baird, 1845
- Bosminopsis Richard, 1895
- Eubosmina Seligo, 1900
