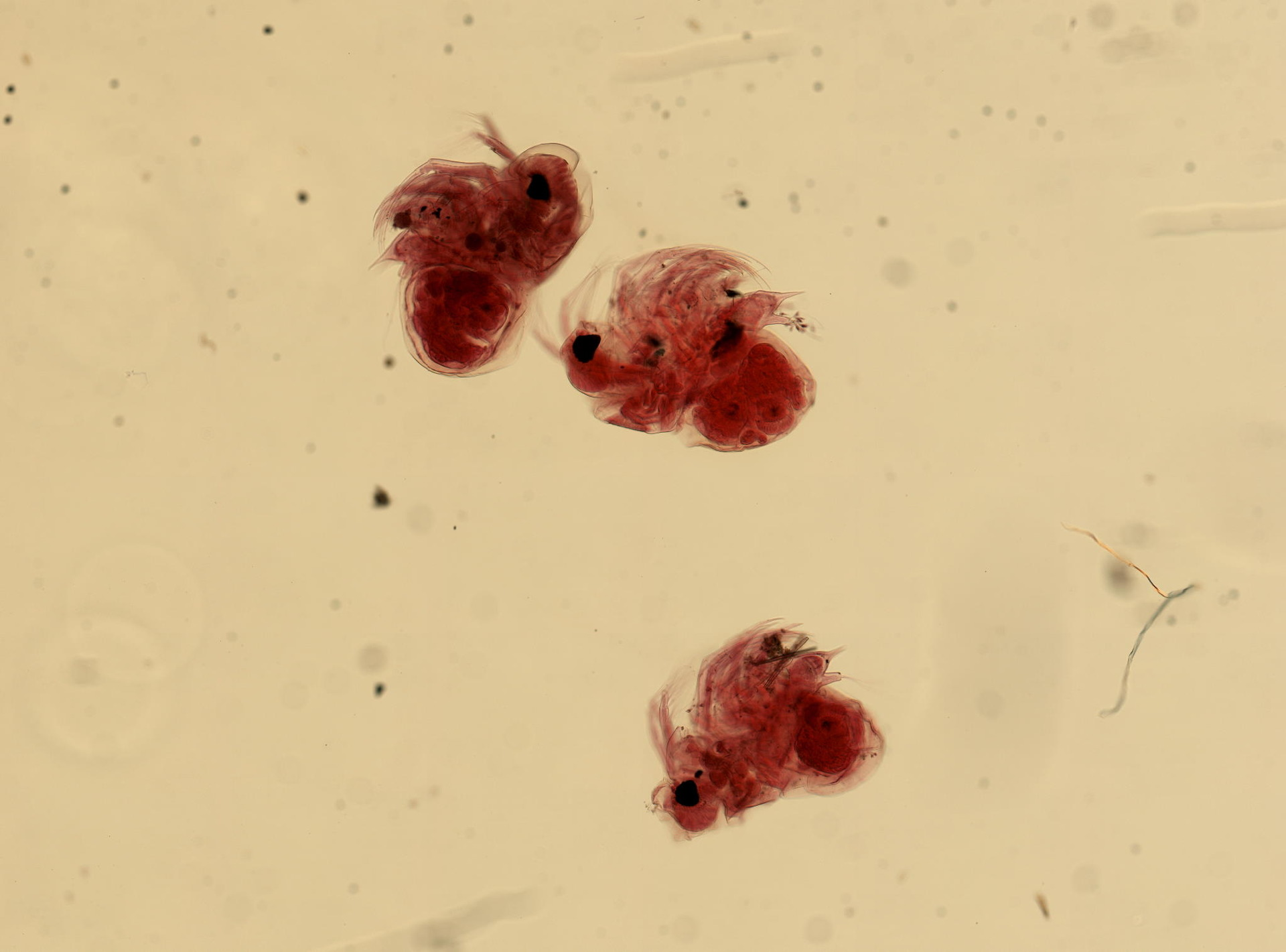
- Podon leuckartii

Scientific classification
- Domain: Eukaryota
- Kingdom: Animalia
- Phylum: Arthropoda
- Class: Branchiopoda
- Order: Onychopoda
- Family: Podonidae; Mordukhai-Boltovskoi, 1968

= Podonidae =

Family of small freshwater animals

Podonidae is a family of onychopods in the order Diplostraca. There are about 8 genera and at least 20 described species in Podonidae. A lot of them are non-native species, many of which pose a great threat to aquatic ecosystems.

== Genera ==
- Caspievadne
- Cornigerius
- Evadne Lovén, 1836
- Pleopis
- Pleopsis Dana, 1853
- Podon Lilljeborg, 1853
- Podonevadne
- Pseudevadne Claus, 1877
