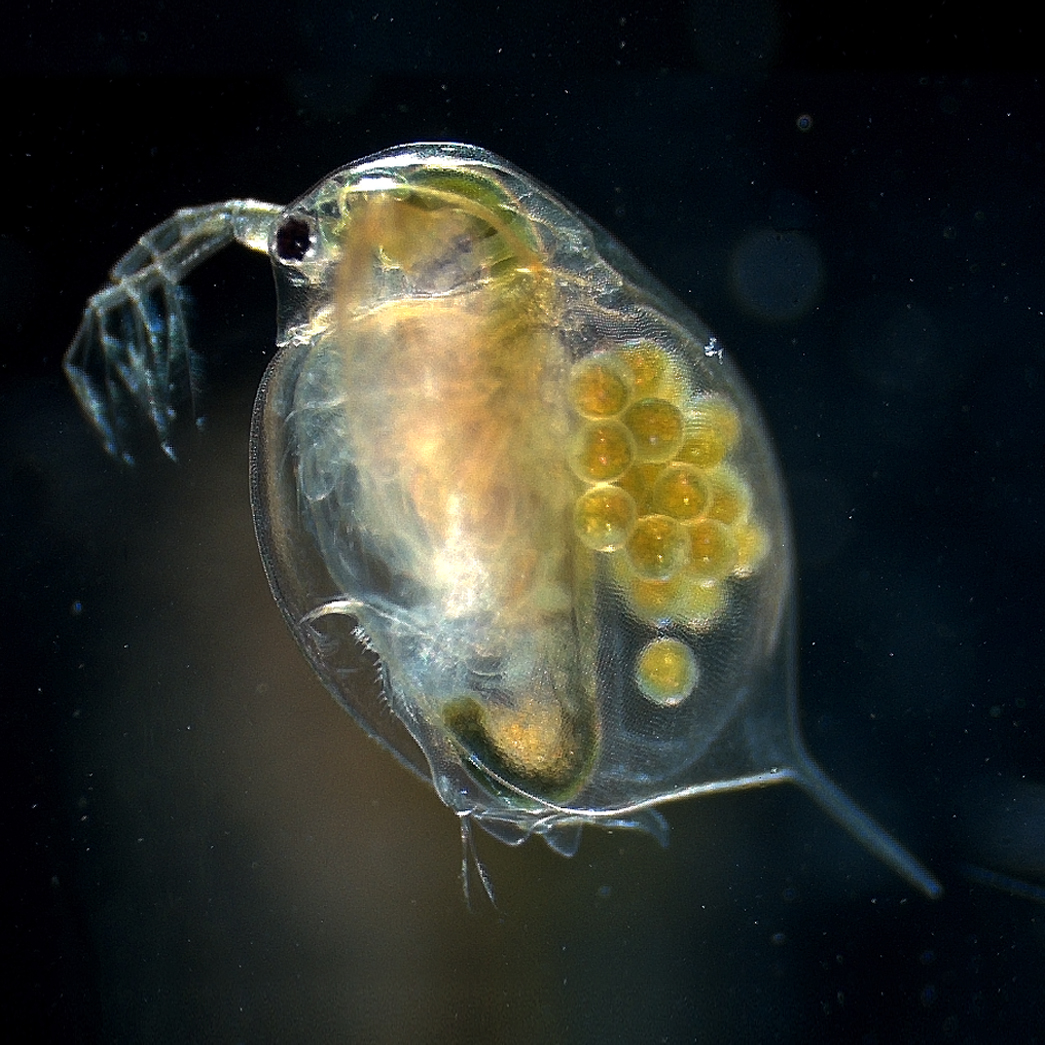
- Daphnia magna (Daphniidae)

Scientific classification
- Kingdom: Animalia
- Phylum: Arthropoda
- Clade: Pancrustacea
- Class: Branchiopoda
- Subclass: Phyllopoda
- Superorder: Diplostraca
- Order: Anomopoda; G. O. Sars, 1865

= Anomopoda =

Order of water fleas

Anomopoda is an order of the superorder Diplostraca. These crustaceans, a type of water flea, are members of the class Branchiopoda. The Anomopoda typically have five pairs of thoracic limbs, but sometimes have six pairs. The head of the Anomopoda lacks a clear separation from the trunk and the posterior, while the abdomen area gradually merges with the anterior of the trunk.

== Families ==
The following families are recognized by the World Register of Marine Species:

- Acantholeberidae Smirnov, 1976
- Bosminidae Baird, 1845
- Chydoridae Dybowski & Grochowski, 1894
- Daphniidae Straus, 1820
- Dumontiidae Santos-Flores & Dodson, 2003
- Eurycercidae Kurz, 1875
- Gondwanothrichidae Van Damme, 2007
- Ilyocryptidae Smirnov, 1976
- Macrothricidae Norman & Brady, 1867
- Moinidae Goulden, 1968
- Ophryoxidae Smirnov, 1976
