= Storage effect =

Ecological mechanism enabling species to coexist

The storage effect is a coexistence mechanism proposed in the ecological theory of species coexistence, which tries to explain how such a wide variety of similar species are able to coexist within the same ecological community or guild. The storage effect was originally proposed in the 1980s to explain coexistence in diverse communities of coral reef fish, however it has since been generalized to cover a variety of ecological communities. The theory proposes one way for multiple species to coexist: in a changing environment, no species can be the best under all conditions. Instead, each species must have a unique response to varying environmental conditions, and a way of buffering against the effects of bad years. The storage effect gets its name because each population "stores" the gains in good years or microhabitats (patches) to help it survive population losses in bad years or patches. One strength of this theory is that, unlike most coexistence mechanisms, the storage effect can be measured and quantified, with units of per-capita growth rate (offspring per adult per generation).

The storage effect can be caused by both temporal and spatial variation. The temporal storage effect (often referred to as simply "the storage effect") occurs when species benefit from changes in year-to-year environmental patterns, while the spatial storage effect occurs when species benefit from variation in microhabitats across a landscape.

The temporal storage effect was initially widely accepted as a mechanisms maintaining species diversity, though recent theoretical and empirical work has drawn its relevance into question.

== The concept ==
For the storage effect to operate, it requires variation (i.e. fluctuations) in the environment and thus can be termed a "fluctuation-dependent mechanism". This variation can come from a large degree of factors, including resource availability, temperature, and predation levels. However, for the storage effect to function, this variation must change the birth, survival, or recruitment rate of species from year to year (or patch to patch).

For competing species within the same community to coexist, they have to meet one fundamental requirement: the impact of competition from a species on itself must exceed its competitive impact on other species. In other words, intraspecific competition must exceed interspecific competition. For example, jackrabbits living in the same area compete for food and nesting grounds. Such competition within the same species is called intraspecific competition, which limits the growth of the species itself. Members from different species can also compete. For instance, jackrabbits and cottontail rabbits also compete for food and nesting grounds. Competition between different species is called interspecific competition, which limits the growth of other species. Stable coexistence occurs when any one species in the community limits its own growth more strongly than the growth of others.

The storage effect mixes three essential ingredients to assemble a community of competing species that fulfill the requirement. They are 1) correlation between the quality of an environment and the amount of competition experienced by a population in that environment (i.e. covariance between environment and competition), 2) differences in species response to the same environment (i.e. species-specific environmental responses), and 3) the ability of a population to diminish the impact of competition under worsening environment (i.e. buffered population growth). Each ingredient is described in detail below with an explanation why the combination of the three leads to species coexistence.

=== Covariance between environment and competition ===
The growth of a population can be strongly influenced by the environment it experiences. An environment consists of not only physical elements such as resource abundance, temperature, and level of physical disturbance, but also biological elements such as the abundance of natural enemies and mutualists. Usually organisms reproduce more in a favorable environment (i.e. either during a good year, or within a good patch), build up their population densities, and lead themselves to a high level of competition due to this increasing crowding. Such a trend means that higher quality environments usually correlate with a higher strength of competition experienced by the organisms in those environments. In short, a better environment results in stronger competition. In statistics, such correlation means that there will be a non-zero covariance between the change of population density in response to the environment and that to the competition. That is why the first ingredient is called "covariance between environment and competition".

=== Species-specific environmental responses ===
Covariance between environment and competition suggests that organisms experience the strongest competition under their optimal environmental conditions because their populations grow most rapidly in those conditions. In nature, we often find that different species from the same community respond to the same conditions in distinctive manners. For example, plant species have different preferred levels of light and water availability, which affect their germination and physical growth rates. Such differences in their response to the environment, which is called "species-specific environmental response," means no two species from a community will have the same best environment in a given year or a given patch. As a result, when a species is under its optimal environmental conditions and thus experiencing the strongest intraspecific competition, other species from the same community only experience the strongest interspecific competition coming from that species, but not the strongest intraspecific competition coming from themselves.

=== Buffered population growth ===
A population can decline when environmental conditions worsen and when competition intensifies. If a species cannot limit the impact of competition in a hostile environment, its population will crash, and it will become locally extinct. Marvelously, in nature organisms are often able to slow down the rate of population decline in a hostile environment by alleviating the impact of competition. In doing so, they are able to set up a lower limit on the rate of their population decline. This phenomenon is called "buffered population growth", which occurs under a variety of situations. Under the temporal storage effect, it can be accomplished by the adults of a species having long life spans, which are relatively unaffected by environmental stressors. For example, an adult tree is unlikely to be killed by a few weeks of drought or a single night of freezing temperatures, whereas a seedling may not survive these conditions. Even if all seedlings are killed by bad environmental conditions, the long-lived adults are able to keep the overall population from crashing. Moreover, the adults usually adopt strategies such as dormancy or hibernation under a hostile environment, which make them less sensitive to competition, and allows them to buffer against the double blades of the hostile environment and competition from their rivals. For a different example, buffered population growth is attained by annual plants with a persistent seed bank. Thanks to these long-lived seeds, the entire population cannot be destroyed by a single bad year. Moreover, the seeds stay dormant under unfavorable environmental conditions, avoiding direct competition with rivals who are favored by the same environment, and thus diminish the impact of competition in bad years. There are some temporal situations in which buffered population growth is not expected to occur. Namely, when multiple generations do not overlap (such as Labord's chameleon) or when adults have a high mortality rate (such as many aquatic insects, or some populations of the Eastern Fence Lizard), buffered growth does not occur. Under the spatial storage effect, buffered population growth is generally automatic, because the effects of a detrimental microhabitat will only be experienced by individuals in that area, rather than the population as a whole.

=== Outcome ===
The combined effect of (1) covariance between environment and competition, and (2) species-specific response to the environment decouple the strongest intraspecific and interspecific competition experienced by a species. Intraspecific competition is strongest when a species is favored by the environment, whereas interspecific competition is strongest when its rivals are favored. After this decoupling, buffered population growth limits the impact of interspecific competition when a species is not favored by the environment. As a consequence, the impact of intraspecific competition on the species favored by a particular environment exceeds that of the interspecific competition on species less favored by that environment. We see that the fundamental requirement for species coexistence is fulfilled and thus storage effect is able to maintain stable coexistence in a community of competing species.

For species to coexist in a community, all species must be able to recover from low density. Not surprisingly, being a coexistence mechanism, the storage effect helps species when they become rare. It does so by making the abundant species’ effect on itself greater than its effect on the rare species. The difference between species’ response to environmental conditions means that a rare species’ optimal environment is not the same as its competitors. Under these conditions, the rare species will experience low levels of interspecific competition. Because the rare species itself is rare, it will experience little impact from intraspecific competition as well, even at its highest possible levels of intraspecific competition. Free from the impact of competition, the rare species is able to make gains in these good years or patches. Moreover, thanks to the buffered population growth, the rare species is able to survive the bad years or patches by "storing" the gains from the good years/patches. As a result, the population of any rare species is able to grow due to the storage effect.

One natural outcome from the covariance between environment and competition is that the species with very low densities will have more fluctuation in its recruitment rates than species with normal densities. This occurs because in good environments, species with high densities will often experience large amount of crowding by members of the same species, thus limiting the benefits of good years/patches, and making good years/patches more similar to bad years/patches. Low-density species are rarely able to cause crowding, thus allowing significantly increased fitness in good years/patches. Since the fluctuation in recruitment rate is an indicator of covariance between environment and competition, and since species-specific environmental response and buffered population growth can normally be assumed in nature, finding much stronger fluctuation in recruitment rates in rare and low-density species provides a strong indication that the storage effect is operating within a community.

== Mathematical formulation ==
The storage effect is not a model for population growth (such as the Lotka–Volterra equation) itself, but is an effect that appears in non-additive models of population growth. Thus, the equations shown below will work for any arbitrary model of population growth, but will only be as accurate as the original model. The derivation below is taken from Chesson 1994. It is a derivation of the temporal storage effect, but is very similar to the spatial storage effect.

The fitness of an individual, as well as expected growth rate, can be measured in terms of the average number of offspring it will leave during its lifetime. If a population has N(t) at time t and N(t+1) individuals in the next time step, then the growth rate on the natural log scale, r(t), can be written as

$$r(t) = \ln \left(\frac{N(t+1)}{N(t)}\right)$$.

The growth rate is a function of both environmental factors, e(t), and how much the organism must compete with other individuals (both of its own species, and different species), c(t). Thus,

$$r(t) = g(e(t), c(t)) \,$$

where g is an arbitrary function for growth rate. Throughout the article, subscripts are occasionally used to represent functions of a particular species (e.g. r_{j}(t) is the fitness of species j). It is assumed that there must be some values e* and c*, such that g(e*, c*) = 0, representing a zero-population growth equilibrium. These values need not be unique, but for every e*, there is a unique c*. For ease of calculation, standard parameters E(t) and C(t) are defined, such that

$$E(t) = g(e(t), c^*) \,$$

$$C(t) = -g(e^*, c(t)) \,$$

Both E and C represent the effect of deviations in environmental response from equilibrium. E represents the effect that varying environmental conditions (e.g. rainfall patterns, temperature, food availability, etc.) have on fitness, in the absence of abnormal competitive effects. For the storage effect to occur, the environmental response for each species must be unique (i.e. E_{j}(t) ≠ E_{i}(t) when j ≠ i). C(t) represents how much average fitness is lowered as a result of competition. For example, if there is more rain during a given year, E(t) will likely increase. If more plants begin to bloom, and thus compete for that rain, then C(t) will increase as well. Because e* and c* are not unique, E(t) and C(t) are not unique, and thus one should choose them as conveniently as possible. Under most conditions (see Chesson 1994), r(t) can be approximated as

$$r(t) = E(t) - C(t) + \gamma E(t)C(t) \,$$

where

$$\gamma = \frac{\partial^2r}{\partial E \, \partial C}$$

γ represents the nonadditivity of growth rates. If γ = 0 (known as additivity) it means that the impact of competition on fitness does not change with the environment. If γ > 0 (superadditivity), it means that the adverse effects of competition during a bad year are relatively worse than during a good year. In other words, a population suffers more from competition in bad years than in good years. If γ < 0 (subadditivity, or buffered population growth), it means that the harm done by competition during a bad year is relatively minor when compared to a good year. In other words, the population is able to diminish the impact of competition as the environment worsens. As stated above, for the storage effect to contribute to species coexistence, we must have buffered population growth (i.e. it must be the case that γ < 0).

The long-term average of the above equation is

$$\bar{r} = \bar{E} - \bar{C} + \gamma (\bar{E}\bar{C} + \text{Cov}(E(t),C(t))) \,$$

which, under environments with sufficient variation relative to mean effects, can be approximated as

$$\bar{r} \approx \bar{E} - \bar{C} + \gamma \text{Cov}(E(t),C(t))$$

For any effect to act as a coexistence mechanism, it must boost the average fitness of an individual when they are at below-normal population density. Otherwise, a species at low density (known as an `invader') will continue to dwindle, and this negative feedback will cause its extinction. When a species is at equilibrium (known as a `resident'), its average long-term fitness must be 0. For a species to recover from low density, its average fitness must be greater than 0. For the remainder of the text, we refer to functions of the invader with the subscript i, and to the resident with the subscript r.

A long-term average growth rate of an invader is often written as

$$\bar{r_i} = \Delta E - \Delta C + \Delta I \,$$

where,

$$\Delta E = \bar{E_i} - \sum_{i\neq r} q_{ir}\bar{E_r} \,$$

$$\Delta C = \bar{C_i} - \sum_{i\neq r} q_{ir}\bar{C_r} \,$$

and, ΔI, the storage effect,

$$\Delta I = \gamma_i \text{Cov}(E_i,C_i) - \sum_{i\neq r} q_{ir}\gamma_r \text{Cov}(E_r, C_r) \,$$

where

$$q_{ir} = \frac{\partial C_i}{\partial C_r}$$

In this equation, q_{ir} tells us how much the competition experienced by r affects the competition experienced by i.

The biological meaning of the storage effect is expressed in the mathematical form of ΔI. The first term of the expression is covariance between environment and competition (Cov(E C)), scaled by a factor representing buffered population growth (γ). The difference between the first term and the second term represents the difference in species responses to the environment between the invader and the sum of the residents, scaled by the effect each resident has on the invader (q_{ir}).

=== Formulation of the spatial storage effect ===
The mathematical formulation of the spatial storage effect is mostly similar, except that it is averaged differently: when a population's growth rate changes over time, the geometric mean growth rate can predict change over time; when growth rate changes over space, the arithmetic mean growth rate predicts change. As such, population growth is tracked using lambda(x,t) (for location x and time t), where

$$\lambda(x,t) = \left(\frac{N(x,t+1)}{N(x,t)}\right) = e^{r(x,t)}$$.

If we assume that growth is still a function of environmental and competitive factors, then growth at a given location can be approximated as

$$\lambda(x,t) \approx 1+ E(x,t) - C(x,t) + \gamma E(x,t)C(x,t) \,$$

(note the 1 here is because a population that exactly replaces itself has a growth rate of $\lambda=$).

Growth variation in space often generates a fitness-density covariance, which occurs when species are crowded where they grow best; this generates a growth impact of Cov(N(x,t),λ(x,t). As such, the average growth rate of a population across space $\tilde{\lambda}$ is

$$\tilde{\lambda} \approx 1 + \bar{E} - \bar{C} + \gamma \text{Cov}(E(x,t),C(x,t)) + \text{Cov}\left(\lambda(x,t),N(x,t)\right)$$

The long-term average growth rate of an invader, i, can then be written as A long-term average growth rate of an invader is often written as

$$\tilde{\lambda_i} = \Delta E - \Delta C + \Delta I + \Delta \Kappa \,$$

where,

$$\Delta E = \bar{E_i} - \sum_{i\neq r} q_{ir}\bar{E_r} \,$$

$$\Delta C = \bar{C_i} - \sum_{i\neq r} q_{ir}\bar{C_r} \,$$

ΔΚ, the fitness-density covariance,

$$\Delta \Kappa = \text{Cov}(\lambda_i,N_i) - \sum_{i\neq r} q_{ir}\gamma_r \text{Cov}(\lambda_r, N_r) \,$$

and, ΔI, the storage effect,

$$\Delta I = \gamma_i \text{Cov}(E_i,C_i) - \sum_{i\neq r} q_{ir}\gamma_r \text{Cov}(E_r, C_r) \,$$

== Predation ==
Recent work has extended what is known about the storage effect to include apparent competition (i.e., competition mediated through a shared predator).

These models showed that generalist predators can undermine the benefits of the storage effect that from competition. This occurs because generalist predators depress population levels by eating individuals. When this happens, there are fewer individuals competing for resources. As a result, relatively abundant species are less constrained by competition for resource in favorable years (i.e., the covariance between environment and competition is weakened), and therefore the storage effect from competition is weakened. This conclusion follows the general trend that the introduction of a generalist predator will often weaken other competition-based coexistence mechanisms, and which result in competitive exclusion.

Additionally, certain types of predators can produce a storage effect from predation. This effect has been shown for frequency-dependent predators, who are more likely to attack prey that are abundant, and for generalist pathogens, who cause outbreaks when prey are abundant. When prey species are especially numerous and active, frequency-dependent predators become more active, and pathogens outbreaks become more severe (i.e., there was a positive covariance between the environment and predation, analogous to the covariance between the environment and competition). As a result, abundant species are limited during their best years by high predation – an effect that is analogous to the storage effect from competition.

== Empirical studies ==
The first empirical study that tested the requirements of the storage effect was done by Pake and Venable, who looked at three desert annual plants. They experimentally manipulated density and water availability over a two-year period, and found that fitness and germination rates varied greatly from year to year, and over different environmental conditions. This shows that each species has a unique environmental response, and implied that likely there is a covariance between environment and competition. This, combined with the buffered population growth that is a product of a long-lived seed bank, showed that a temporal storage effect was probably an important factor in mediating coexistence. This study was also important, because it showed that variation in germination conditions could be a major factor promoting species coexistence.

The first attempt made at quantifying the temporal storage effect was by Carla Cáceres in 1997. Using 30 years of water-column data from Oneida Lake, New York, she studied the effect the storage effect had on two species of plankton (Daphnia galeata mendotae and D. pulicaria). These species of plankton lay diapausing eggs which, much like the seeds of annual plants, lay dormant in the sediment for many years before hatching. Cáceres found that the size of reproductive bouts were fairly uncorrelated between the two species. She also found, in the absence of the storage effect, D. galeata mendotae would have gone extinct. She was unable to measure certain important parameters (such as the rate of egg predation), but found that her results were robust to a wide range of estimates.

The first test of the spatial storage effect was done by Sears and Chesson in the desert area east of Portal, Arizona. Using a common neighbor-removal experiment, they examined whether coexistence between two annual plants, Erodium cicutarium and Phacelia popeii, was due to the spatial storage effect or resource partitioning. The storage effect was quantified in terms of number of inflorescences (a proxy for fitness) instead of actual population growth rate. They found that E. cicutarium was able to outcompete P. popeii in many situations, and in the absence of the storage effect, would likely competitively exclude P. popeii. However, they found a very strong difference in the covariance between environment and competition, which showed that some of the most favorable areas for P. popeii (the rare species), were unfavorable to E. cicutarium (the common species). This suggests that P. popeii is able to avoid strong interspecific competition in some good patches, and that this may be enough to compensate for losses in areas favorable to E. cicutarium.

Colleen Kelly and colleagues have used congeneric species pairs to examine storage dynamics where species similarity is a natural outcome of relatedness and not dependent on researcher-based estimates. Initial studies were of 12 species of trees coexisting in a tropical deciduous forest at the Chamela Biological Station in Jalisco, Mexico. For each of the 12 species they examined age structure (calculated from size and species-specific growth rate), and found that recruitment of young trees varies from year to year. Grouping the species into 6 congeneric pairs, the locally rarer species of each pair unanimously had a more irregular age distributions than the more common species. This finding strongly suggests that between closely competing tree species, the rarer species experiences stronger recruitment fluctuation than the commoner species. Such difference in recruitment fluctuation, combined with evidence of greater competitive ability in the rarer species of each pair, indicates a difference in covariance between the environment and competition between rare and common species. Since species-specific environmental response and buffered population growth can be naturally assumed, their finding strongly suggests that the storage effect operates in this tropical deciduous forest so as to maintain the coexistence between different tree species. Further work with these species has shown that the storage dynamic is a pairwise, competitive relationship, between congeneric species pairs, and possibly extending as successively nested pairs within a genus.

Angert and colleagues demonstrated the temporal storage effect occurring in the desert annual plant community on Tumamoc Hill, Arizona. Previous studies had shown the annual plants in that community exhibited a trade-off between growth rate (a proxy for competitive ability) and water use efficiency (a proxy for drought tolerance). As a result, some plants grew better during wet years, while others grew better during dry years. This, combined with variation in germination rates, produced an overall community average storage effect of 0.103. In other words, the storage effect is expected to help the population of any species at low density to increase, on average, by 10.3% each generation, until it recovers from low density.

More recent studies attempted to quantify multiple coexistence mechanisms at once. These studies generally concluded that the storage effect was a weaker than other mechanism. For example, a laboratory study of plankton showed that a storage effect was promoting coexistence, but its impact was weaker than relative nonlinearity. Similarly, studies of annual plant and semi-arid grassland communities found that the storage effect had a small to negligible impact on coexistence, and that coexistence was maintained by variation-independent mechanisms.

== Theoretical criticisms ==
Several empirical studies quantified multiple coexistence mechanisms at once, and mostly found that the storage effect was weaker than other mechanisms. Recent theoretical work attempted to understand why. It argued that most studies of the temporal storage effect focused on a narrow set of theoretical models that had very similar assumptions. It showed four such assumptions which, if removed, greatly weaken the storage effect.

1. Models assume that interspecific and intraspecific competition coefficients are identical or nearly identical. However, analysis showed that even small difference in effects can have a larger impact than storage effects brought on by intense differences in environmental response.
2. Models assumed that species had huge year-to-year differences in growth rates, but nearly identical growth rates on average. However, analysis showed that small differences in average adaptedness can create fitness differences that are stronger than the stabilizing impact of a fairly strong storage effect.
3. Models assume that environmental effects in a particular year have a tight link to competition that year. However, many factors (e.g. competition between age cohorts, or delayed impacts of density-dependence) will mean that competition in a given year is a result of environmental effects in previous years, and this will weaken the storage effect.
4. Models define coexistence using mutual invasibility (i.e. that every species can have a positive growth rate when they are rare). In most instances, communities that meet this criterion tend to have low extinction rates. However, the environmental variation that is necessary for the storage effect to occur strongly increases extinctions, in some cases faster than what would be expected in a neutral community.
