= Fitness-density covariance =

The fitness-density covariance (also known as *growth-density covariance*) is a coexistence mechanism that can allow similar species to coexist because they are in different locations. This effect will be the strongest if species are completely segregated, but can also work if their populations overlap somewhat. If a fitness-density covariance is operating, then when a species becomes very rare, its population will shift to predominantly locations with favorable conditions (e.g., less competition or good habitat). Similarly, when a species becomes very common, then conditions will worsen where they are most common, and they will spread into areas where conditions are less favorable. This negative feedback can help species avoid being driven extinct by competition, and it can prevent stronger species from becoming too common and crowding out other species.

Along with storage effects and relative nonlinearities, fitness-density covariances make up the three variation-dependent mechanisms of modern coexistence theory.

== Mathematical derivation ==
Here, we will consider competition between n species. We will define N_{xj}(t) as the number of individuals of species j at patch x and time t, and λ_{xj}(t) the fitness (i.e., the per-capita contribution of individual to the next time period through survival and reproduction) of individuals of species js at patch x and time t. λ_{xj}(t) will be determined by many things, including habitat, intraspecific competition, and interspecific competition at x. Thus, if there are currently N_{xj}(t) individuals at x, then they will contribute N_{xj(t)}λ_{xj}(t) individuals to the next time period (i.e., t+1). Those individuals may stay at x, or they may move; the net contribution of x to next year's population will be the same.

With our definitions in place, we want to calculate the finite rate of increase of species j (i.e., its population-wide growth rate), $\tilde{\lambda}(t)$. It is defined such that $\tilde{\lambda_j}(t) = \overline{N_j(t+1)}/ \overline{N_j(t)}$, where each average is across all space. In essence, it is the average fitness of members of species j in year t. We can calculate N_{j}(t+1) by summing N_{xj(t)}λ_{xj}(t) across all patches, giving

$$\tilde{\lambda}(t) = \frac{1}{X}\sum_X \frac{N_{xj}(t)\lambda_{xj}(t)}{\overline{N_j(t)}} ,$$

where X is the number of patches. Defining $\nu_{xj} = N_{xj}(t)/\overline{N_j(t)}$ as species j's relative density at x, this equation becomes

$$\tilde{\lambda_j}(t) = \frac{1}{X}\sum_X \nu_{xj}\lambda_{xj}(t) = \overline{\nu_{xj}\lambda_{xj}(t)}.$$

Using the theorem that $\overline{XY} = \overline{X}~\overline{Y} + \mbox{cov}(X,Y)$, this simplifies to

$$\tilde{\lambda_j}(t) = \overline{\nu_{xj}}\overline{\lambda_{xj}(t)}+ \mbox{cov}(\nu_{xj}, \lambda_{xj}(t)).$$

Since $\nu_{xj} = N_{xj}(t)/\overline{N_{xj}(t)}$, its average will be 1. Thus,

$$\tilde{\lambda_j}(t) = \overline{\lambda_{xj}(t)}+ \mbox{cov}(\nu_{xj}, \lambda_{xj}(t)).$$

Thus, we have partitioned $\tilde{\lambda_j}(t)$ into two key parts: $\overline{\lambda_{xj}(t)}$ calculates the fitness of an individual, on average in any given site. Thus, if species are distributed uniformly across the landscape, $\tilde{\lambda_j}(t)=\overline{\lambda_{xj}(t)}$. If, however, they are distributed non-randomly across the environment, then cov(ν_{xj}, λ_{xj}(t)) will be non-zero. If individuals are found predominantly in good sites, then cov(ν_{xj}, λ_{xj}(t)) will be positive; if they are found predominantly in poor sites, then cov(ν_{xj}, λ_{xj}(t)) will be negative.

To analyze how species coexist, we perform an invasion analysis. In short, we remove one species (called the "invader") from the environment, and allow the other species (called the "residents") to come the equilibrium (so that $\tilde{\lambda_r}(t) = 1$ for each resident). We then determine if the invader has a positive growth rate. If each species has a positive growth rate as an invader, then they can coexist.

Because $\tilde{\lambda_r}(t) = 1$ for each resident, we can calculate the invader's growth rate, $\tilde{\lambda_i}(t)$, as

$$\tilde{\lambda_i}(t) = \tilde{\lambda_i}(t) - \frac{1}{n-1} \sum (\tilde{\lambda_r}(t) - 1),$$

where n-1 is the number of residents (since n is the number of species), and the sum is over all residents (and thus represents an average). Using our formula for $\tilde{\lambda_j}(t)$, we find that

$$\tilde{\lambda_i}(t) = [\overline{\lambda_{xi}(t)}+ \mbox{cov}(\nu_{xi}, \lambda_{xi}(t)) ] - \frac{1}{n-1} \sum [\overline{\lambda_{xr}(t)}+ \mbox{cov}(\nu_{xr}, \lambda_{xr}(t))- 1].$$

This rearranges to

$$\tilde{\lambda_i}(t) =1+ \left[ \overline{\lambda_{xi}(t)} -\frac{1}{n-1} \sum \overline{\lambda_{xr}(t)} \right]+ \Delta \kappa .$$

where

$$\Delta \kappa = \mbox{cov}(\nu_{xi}, \lambda_{xi}(t)) - \frac{1}{n-1} \sum \mbox{cov}(\nu_{xr}, \lambda_{xr}(t))$$

is the fitness-density covariance, and $\left[ \overline{\lambda_{xi}(t)} -\frac{1}{n-1} \sum \overline{\lambda_{xr}(t)} \right]$ contains all other mechanisms (such as the spatial storage effect).

Thus, if Δκ is positive, then the invader's population is more able to build up its population in good areas (i.e., ν_{xi} is higher where λ_{xi}(t) is large), compared to the residents. This can occur if the invader builds up in good areas (i.e., cov(ν_{xi}, λ_{xi}(t)) is very positive) or if the residents are forced into poor areas (i.e., cov(ν_{xr}, λ_{xr}(t)) is less positive, or negative). In either case, species gain an advantage when they are invaders, a key point of any stabilizing mechanism.
