= David Cushing =

English-born fisheries biologist

David Henry Cushing
- Born: 14 March 1920; Alnwick, England
- Died: 14 March 2008 (aged 88); England
- Education: Balliol College, Oxford University
- Known for: Match/Mismatch Hypothesis; North Sea Herring Fisheries
- Awards: Fellow of the Royal Society (1977); Rosenstiel Medal (1980); Medal of Albert 1er of Monaco (1984); American Fisheries Science Excellence Award (1987); ECI Prize Winner (1992); German Ecology Prize (1993)
- Scientific career
- Fields: Fisheries Biology
- Workplaces: Journal of Plankton Research (Founding Editor); CEFAS; ICES

David Henry Cushing FRS (14 March 1920 – 14 March 2008) was an English born fisheries biologist, who is credited with the development the match/mismatch hypothesis as an explanation for reduced fish stocks as associated with climatic variability. David Cushing was the first to demonstrate what we now know as "recruitment overfishing" through his work on the collapse of the North Sea herring.

== Early life ==
Cushing was born in Alnwick, England. His father was an English teacher and his mother was a nurse. By way of his own desire to be a naturalist, his father's desire for him to become a diplomat, and his mother's desire for him to become a doctor, Cushing found a great interest in fisheries biology and management. Cushing also served in the British military in the Royal Artillery (1940–1945) and the Royal Fusiliers (1945–1946). Cushing is survived by his wife, Diana Antona-Traversi, whom he married in 1943, and his daughter.

== Career ==
Cushing received his lower education from Duke's School (Alnwick) and the Royal Grammar School (Newcastle upon Tyne) and received his PhD in 1950 from Balliol College at Oxford University. His PhD dissertation focused on the vertical migration of zooplankton.

After receiving his PhD, Cushing worked primarily for government organisations that oversaw the fisheries in Great Britain. For most of his career (1946–1980), he worked for the Centre for Environment, Fisheries, and Aquaculture Science (CEFAS). At CEFAS, he held the positions of scientific officer, deputy director, and as the head of fish population dynamics. His last position allowed him to focus primarily on factors influencing the stock dynamics of local fisheries and the management strategies those fisheries open.

Cushing, although not directly employed by, worked closely with the International Council for the Exploration of the Sea (ICES). At ICES, Cushing held positions on advisory committees for fisheries management and marine pollution. He also chaired the biological committee and was the head of the herring workgroup.

The most prestigious position that Cushing held was that of the founding editor of the Journal of Plankton Research, which he held from 1979 to 2001.

== Contributions to fish population ecology ==
=== Acoustic fish detection ===
Acoustics were greatly improved upon during World War II so as to be used as a tool to detect unfriendly vessels and underwater hazards. After the war, acoustic detection was seen as a tool that could assist fisheries biologists to sample stock sizes. Cushing investigated the mechanisms that permitted the acoustic returns from the signalling devices to the fish and back. Through experimental procedures, using materials such as meat-filled condoms and air-filled balloons, Cushing determined that greater than 50% of the acoustic return was from the swimbladder of the fish. Cushing and colleagues also determined that it was possible to resolve, on the species level, the identity of a mass of fish through precise acoustic signals.

=== Match/mismatch hypothesis ===
The match/mismatch hypothesis was coined by Cushing as a result of noticeable variations in fish stock recruitment. The hypothesis focused on the timing, as a function of climate, of the blooms of primary producers (i.e. phytoplankton). Blooms of phytoplankton directly influence the increased population sizes of zooplankton, as the phytoplankton are the primary food source for zooplankton. Most pelagic fish, in their larval stages, feed directly upon the phytoplankton and zooplankton. So as logic follows, large populations of phytoplankton will support large populations of zooplankton, and the presence of both will sustain larval fishes. As Cushing noticed, however, there are climatic influences where temperature anomalies will inhibit phytoplankton blooms, or impact the range of the bloom. When such events occur, they will have cascading effects that will influence the ability for larval fish to develop, thus reducing the number of fish that recruit into an existing population. With the previously mentioned events, the "match" portion of the hypothesis occurs when plankton blooms occur just prior the hatching of the fish larvae. In a "match" situation, the fish larvae are able to feed on large quantities of plankton, thus increasing their potential for successful recruitment. The "mismatch" portion of the hypothesis occurs when plankton blooms occur either earlier than usual, later than usual, or simply in far lesser quantities than expected. As a result, there are less prey for the fish larvae to feed upon, and the success of a recruitment event is severely diminished.

The match/mismatch hypothesis is featured in many of Cushing's writings, however the most influential purpose of the hypothesis is that of awareness of climate change and fisheries management. The intent of the hypothesis was to explain climate induced temperature anomalies (as a result of climate change) on fish stocks and the proper management strategies that could be associated with such changes. With some level of predictability, then, fish stocks would then avoid over-exploitation and be harvested at sustainable levels.

== Publications ==
- Marine Ecology and Fisheries (Cambridge University Press, 1970)
- Plankton production and year-class strength in fish populations: an update of the match/mismatch hypothesis (1990) in Advances in Marine Biology
- Climate and Fisheries (Academic Press New York, 1982)
- Thiel, H. (1997). "David H. Cushing: Towards a Science of Recruitment in Fish Populations. Excellence in Ecology7, Ed. O. Kinne Ecology Institute, Oldendorf/Luhe 175 pp., 71 Figures, 6 Tables". Internationale Revue der gesamten Hydrobiologie und Hydrographie. 82 (4): 563. doi:10.1002/iroh.19970820413. ISSN 0932-2205.
- Cushing, D. H.; Edwards, R. W. (1996). "Raymond John Heaphy Beverton, C. B. E. 29 August 1922 – 23 July 1995". Biographical Memoirs of Fellows of the Royal Society. 42: 24–38. doi:10.1098/rsbm.1996.0003.
- Beverton, R. J. H.; Cushing, D. H. (1992). "John Alan Gulland. 16 September 1926 – 24 June 1990". Biographical Memoirs of Fellows of the Royal Society. 38: 164. doi:10.1098/rsbm.1992.0009.
- Cushing, D. (2005). "Reginald Dawson Preston. 21 July 1908 – 3 May 2000: Elected F.R.S. 1954". Biographical Memoirs of Fellows of the Royal Society. 51: 347. doi:10.1098/rsbm.2005.0022.
- The Provident Sea (Cambridge University Press, 1988)
- Population Production and Regulation in the Sea: a Fisheries Perspective (Cambridge University Press, 1995)
