= Daphnia sinevi =

Scientific classification
- Domain: Eukaryota
- Kingdom: Animalia
- Phylum: Arthropoda
- Class: Branchiopoda
- Order: Anomopoda
- Family: Daphniidae
- Genus: Daphnia
- Subgenus: Daphnia
- Species: D. sinevi

Binomial name
- Daphnia sinevi Kotov et al., 2006

Species of small freshwater animal

Daphnia sinevi is a species of water fleas from the Russian Far East.

== Description ==
Daphnia sinevi grows to a length of 1.73 millimetres (0.068 in).

== Distribution and taxonomy ==
Daphnia sinevi is only known from a single pool, 10 metres (33 ft) in diameter at Avangard, near Nakhodka, Primorsky Krai, Russia. It was collected there in 2004 by A. Y. Sinev, and described in 2006 in the Journal of Plankton Research. The holotype, along with an allotype and a series of paratypes are held at the Zoological Museum of Moscow State University. The closest relatives of D. sinevi are other species in the species group around D. curvirostris, especially Daphnia morsei.
