= Relative nonlinearity =

Relative nonlinearity is a coexistence mechanism that maintains species diversity via differences in the response to and effect on variation in resource density or some other factor mediating competition. Relative nonlinearity depends on two processes: 1) species have to differ in the curvature of their responses to resource density and 2) the patterns of resource variation generated by each species must favor the relative growth of another species. In its most basic form, one species grows best under equilibrium competitive conditions and another performs better under variable competitive conditions. Like all coexistence mechanisms, relative nonlinearity maintains species diversity by concentrating intraspecific competition relative to interspecific competition. Because resource density can be variable, intraspecific competition is the reduction of per-capita growth rate under variable resources generated by conspecifics (i.e. individuals of the same species). Interspecific competition is the reduction of per-capita growth rate under variable resources generated by heterospecifics (i.e. individuals of a different species). Like some other coexistence mechanisms (see the storage effect), relative nonlinearity can allow coexistence of at least two species on a single resource.

== Functional components ==
=== Differential nonlinear responses to resources ===
Relative nonlinearity requires that species differ in the curvature of their fitness response $\phi_i$ to some competitive factor, F, like resource density. The nonlinearity of a response to competition is the second derivative of the per-capita growth rate with respect to the competitive factor $\phi_i^{\prime \prime}(F)$, which is zero if the growth response is linear, positive if the response is accelerating (convex), and negative if the response is decelerating (concave). For competition between two species, the greater the difference in the curvatures of their response to changes in a competitive factor, the greater the differences in their overall specialization on competitive factor variation. For example, by Jensen's inequality, compared to constant resource density, variation in a competitive factor has no effect on species with zero curvature, positive effects on species with positive curvature, and negative effects on species with negative curvature. Thus, $\phi_i^{\prime \prime}(F)$ indicates a species response to variation in competitive factors, a dimension of competition that can be partitioned.

Competitive factors are best thought of as dimensions of the environment that are jointly used by more than one species and contribute to a reduction in performance of individuals when used. For example, space is a common competitive factor for trees because many species require space for new trees to grow and the reduction in space reduces opportunities for other species to capture that space and grow. Resources and predators have similar properties and count as competitive factors. For competition between two species for a single shared resource, it is easy enough to think of the competitive factor as the reduction in species density due to consumption. In the absence of resource consumption, resources will tend to be at some equilibrium value, K. Thus, the competitive factor for our example is $F = K - R$ for any value of R.

The original demonstration of relative nonlinearity was in a consumer-resource model with differences in functional responses of the two species. One species has a Type I functional response and has zero curvature. The second species has a Type II functional response - which occurs when individuals must spend time handling resources before moving on to the next resource - and has negative curvature. Because the second species is limited by time when capturing resources, it is unable to exploit resources at high density compared to its competitor. If the Type II functional response species does better under average conditions than the species with a Type I functional response, the species differ in their response to equilibrium and variable resource density.

=== Differential effect on resource variation ===
Not only must species respond differently to variation in competition, species must also affect variation in competition differently.

Given these two processes, differential effects on and response to resource variation, species may coexist via relative nonlinearity.

== Mathematical derivation ==
Here, we will show how relative nonlinearity can occur between two species. We will start by deriving the average growth rate of a single species. Let us assume that each species' growth rate depends on some density-dependent factor, F, such that

$$\frac{dN_j}{dt} = \phi_j(F)N_j$$,

where N_{j} is species j's population density, and $\phi_j(F)$ is some function of the density-dependent factor F. For example, under a Monod chemostat model, F would be the resource density, and $\phi_j(F)$ would be $a_jF - d$, where a_{j} is the rate that species j can uptake the resource, and d is its death rate. In a classic paper by Armstrong and McGehee [cite Armstrong], $\phi_j(F)$ was the a Type I functional response for one species and a Type II functional response for the other. We can approximate the per-capita growth rate, $r_j = \frac{1}{N_j} \frac{dN_j}{dt}$, using a Taylor series approximation as

$$r_j \approx \phi_j(\overline{F}) + (F - \overline{F}) \phi_j(\overline{F})' + \frac{1}{2} (F - \overline{F})^2 \phi_j(\overline{F})''$$,

where $\overline{F}$ is the average value of F. If we take the average growth rate over time (either over a limit cycle, or over an infinite amount of time), then it becomes

$$\overline{r_j} \approx \phi_j(\overline{F}) + \frac{1}{2} \sigma^2_F \phi_j(\overline{F})''$$,

where $\sigma^2_F$ is the variance of F. This occurs because the average of $(F - \overline{F})$ is 0, and the average of $(F - \overline{F})^2$ is the variance of F. Thus, we see that a species' average growth rate is helped by variation if Φ is convex, and it is hurt by variation if Φ is concave.

We can measure the effect that relative nonlinearity has on coexistence using an invasion analysis. To do this, we set one species' density to 0 (we call this the invader, with subscript i), and allow the other species (the resident, with subscript r) is at a long-term steady state (e.g., a limit cycle). If the invader has a positive growth rate, then it cannot be excluded from the system. If both species have a positive growth rate as the invader, then they can coexist.

Though the resident's density may fluctuate, its average density over the long-term will not change (by assumption). Therefore, $\overline{r_r} = 0$. Because of this, we can write the invader's density as

$$\overline{r_i} = \overline{r_i} - \overline{r_r}$$

. Substituting in our above formula for average growth, we see that

$$\overline{r_i} \approx \left(\phi_i(\overline{F}) + \frac{1}{2} \sigma^2_F \phi_i(\overline{F})'' \right) - \left(\phi_r(\overline{F}) + \frac{1}{2} \sigma^2_F \phi_r(\overline{F})'' \right)$$.

We can rearrange this to

$$\overline{r_i} \approx \left(\phi_i(\overline{F}) - \phi_r(\overline{F}) \right) + \Delta N_i$$,

where $\Delta N_i$ quantifies the effect of relative nonlinearity,

$$\Delta N_i = \frac{1}{2} \sigma^2_F \left( \phi_i(\overline{F})''- \phi_r(\overline{F})'' \right)$$.

Thus, we have partition the invader's growth rate into two components. The left term represents the variation-independent mechanisms, and will be positive if the invader is less hindered by a shortage of resources. Relative nonlinearity, $\Delta N_i$ will be positive, and thus help species i to invade, if $\phi_i(\overline{F})''> \phi_r(\overline{F})''$ (i.e., if the invader is less harmed by variation than the resident). However, relative nonlinearity will hinder species i's ability to invade if $\phi_i(\overline{F})'' < \phi_r(\overline{F})''$.

Under most circumstances, relative nonlinearity will help one species to invade, and hurt the other. It will have a net positive impact on coexistence if its sum across all species is positive (i.e., $\Delta N_j + \Delta N_k > 0$ for species j and k). The $\phi_j(\overline{F})$ terms will generally not change much when the invader changes, but the variation in F will. For the sum of the $\Delta N_i$ terms to be positive, the variation in F must be larger when the species with the more positive (or less negative) $\phi_j(\overline{F})''$ is the invader.
