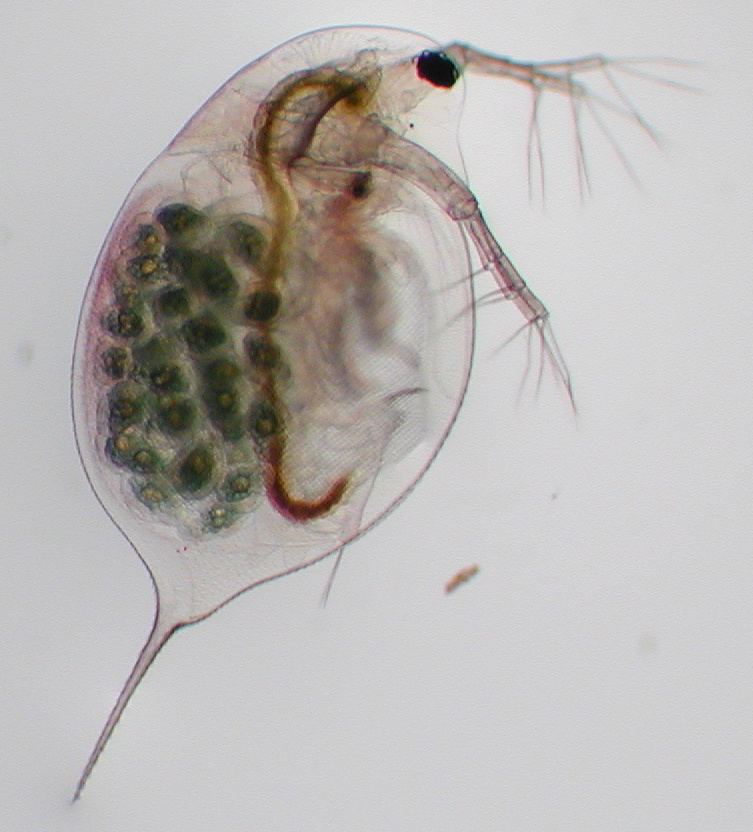
- Adult female Daphnia longispina

Scientific classification
- Domain: Eukaryota
- Kingdom: Animalia
- Phylum: Arthropoda
- Class: Branchiopoda
- Order: Anomopoda
- Family: Daphniidae
- Genus: Daphnia
- Subgenus: Daphnia
- Species: D. longispina

Binomial name
- Daphnia longispina O. F. Müller, 1776 .

= Daphnia longispina =

Species of small freshwater animal

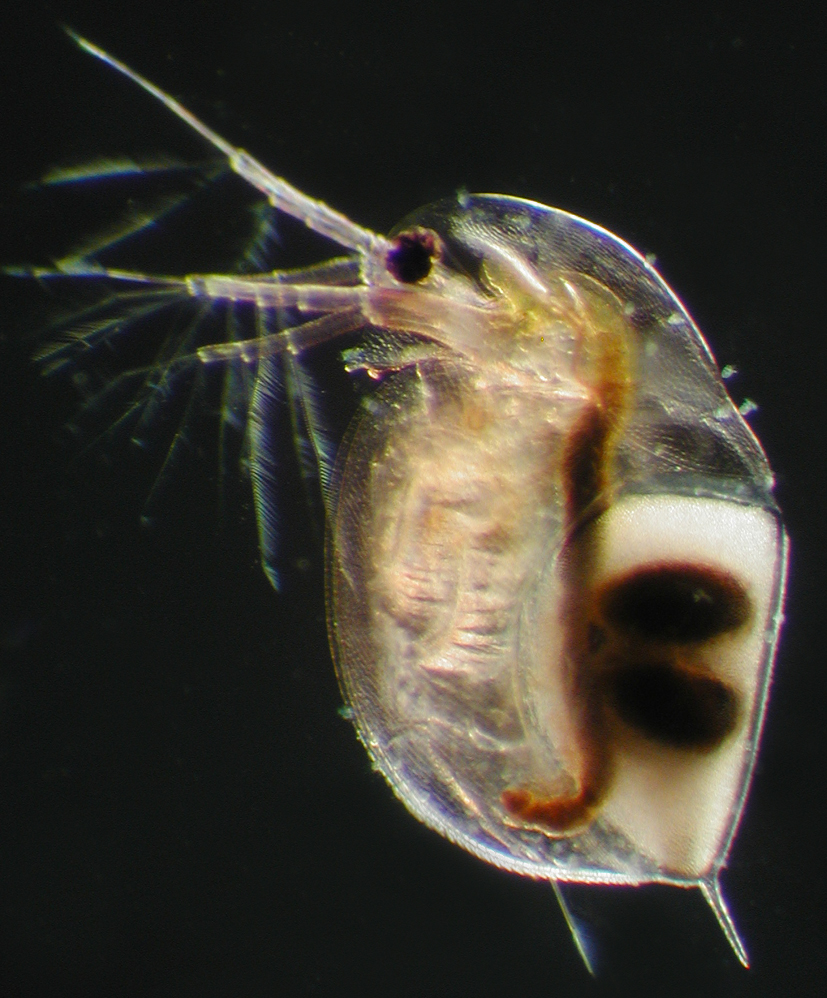
Female Daphnia longispina carrying a resting egg ephippium. The two dark, oval spots on the ephippium mark the places where the two resting eggs are located. The female was collected in a rock pool in South-Western Finland. The animal is about 2 mm long.

Daphnia longispina is a planktonic crustacean of the family Daphniidae, a cladoceran freshwater water flea. It is native to Eurasia. D. longispina is similar in size and sometimes confused with the often sympatric D. pulex (a very common species), but much smaller than D. magna. D. longispina is found in a wide range of standing freshwater bodies from small, ephemeral rock-pools to large lakes.

== Life history ==
Like all Daphnia species, D. longispina is a filter feeder, collecting particles of about 2 to 40 μm suspended in the water. The main food are green algae. At 20 °C maturity is reached within about 6 to 12 days, followed by a period of regular reproduction in about 3-4 day intervals. D. longispina reproduces either asexually (parthenogenesis) or sexually. For the latter, females need to produce sons asexually. The same or other females can switch at any moment from asexual to sexual reproduction, but producing haploid eggs, which require fertilization by males. The sexual eggs are then deposited in an ephippium (plural: ephippia, a resting egg shell), which will sink into the bottom of the water body when the female molts her carapace. After a resting period, which can last several years, the resting stages hatches. Only females emerge from the resting stages.

== Systematics and evolution ==
Within the genus Daphnia, D. longispina belongs to the subgenus Hyalodaphnia, sometimes called the D. longispina complex. Closely related species of D. longispina in this complex are D. galeata and D. cucullata, with which D. longispina frequently hybridises. A revision of the species complex recently showed that the species D. rosea, D. hyalina and D. zschokkei belong to the species D. longispina, invalidating their species status.

== Parasitism ==
In contrast to other Daphnia species, (e.g. D. magna) only few parasites have been reported to infect D. longispina. It is however frequently subject to colonization by epibionts, such as peritrich ciliates and algae.
