= Match/mismatch =

Hypothesis to explain recruitment variation

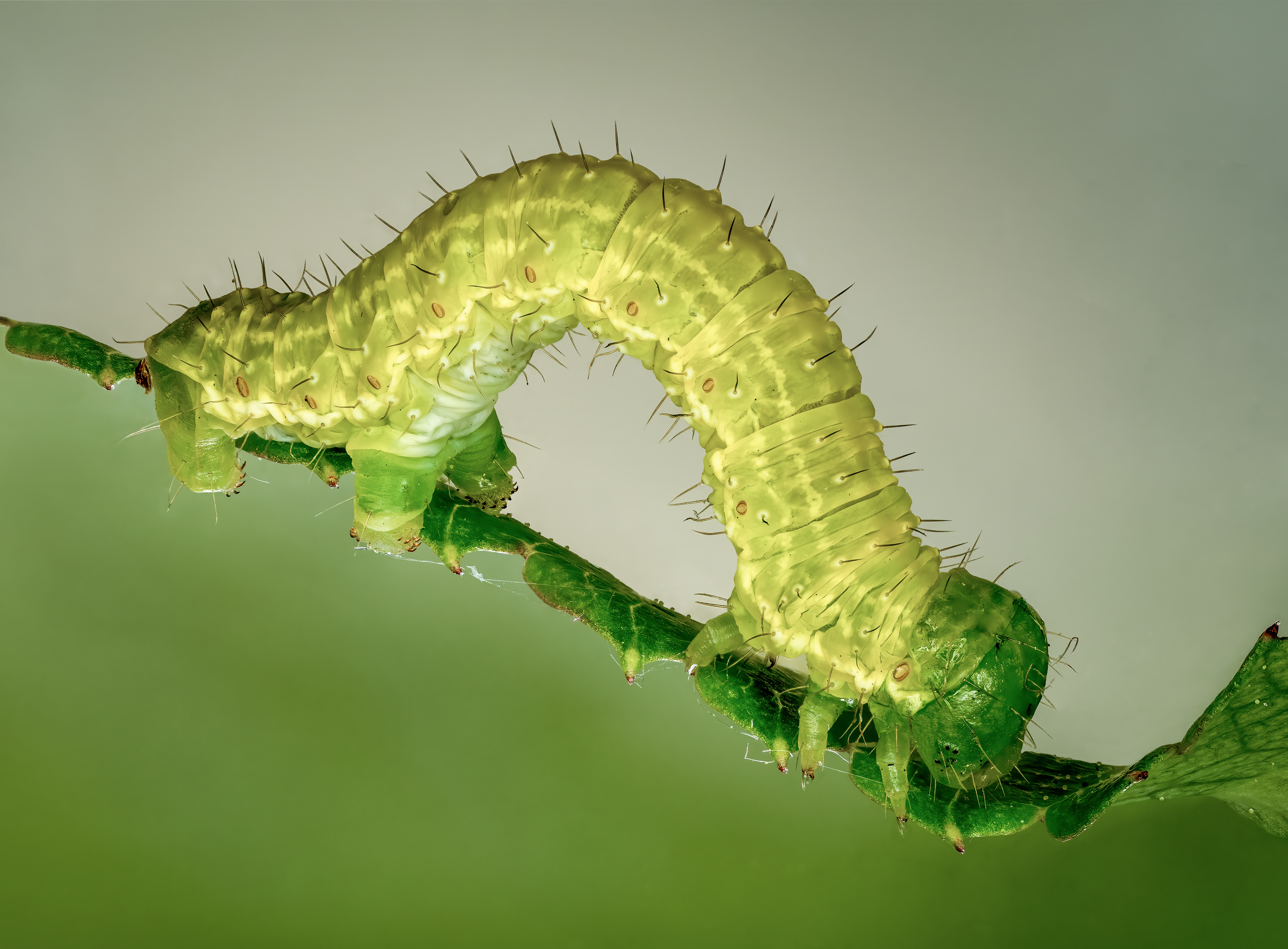

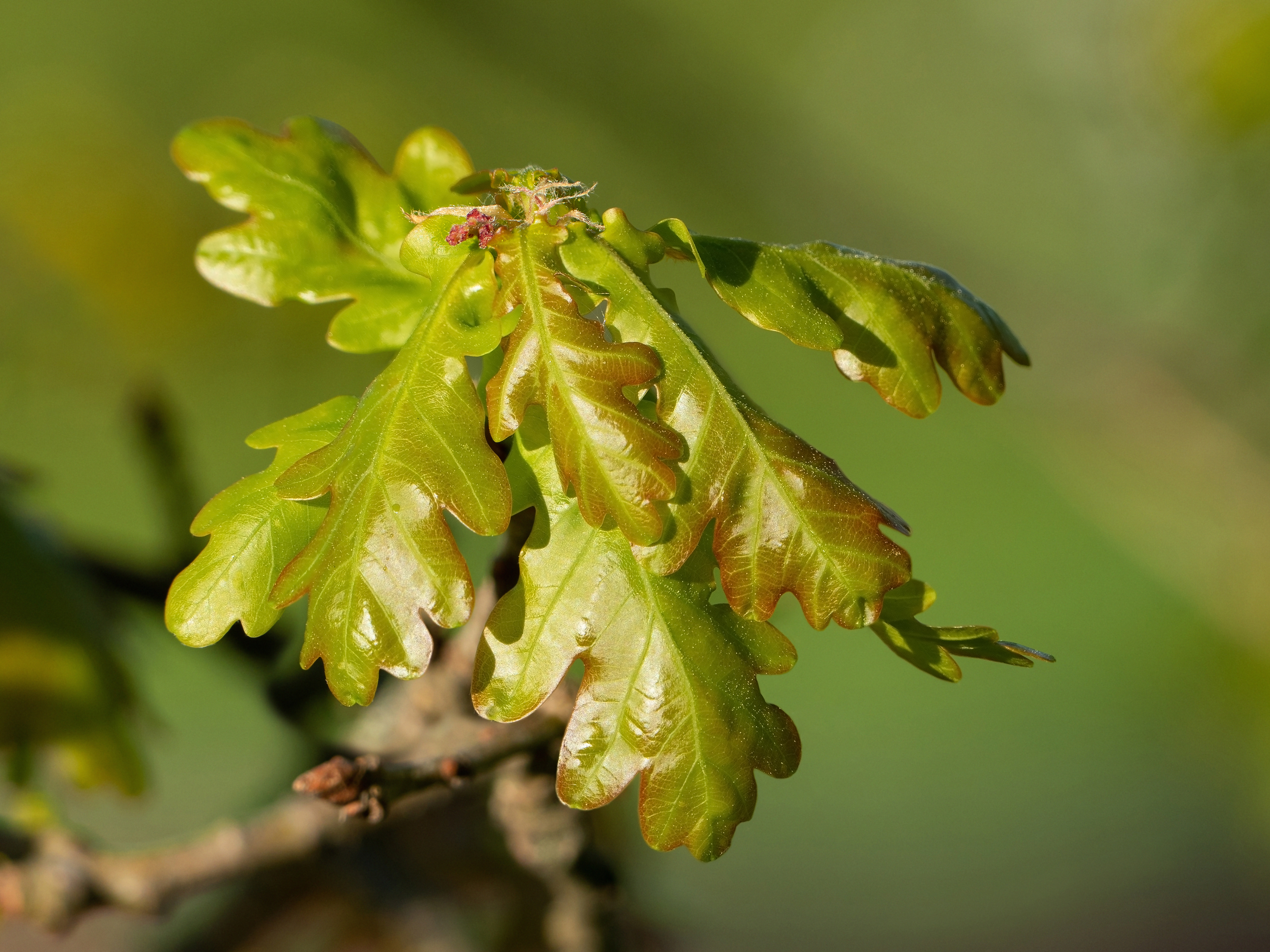
The synchrony between winter moth egg hatching and the emergence of new oak buds is an example of a phenological match.

The match/mismatch hypothesis (MMH) was first described by David Cushing. The MMH "seeks to explain recruitment variation in a population by means of the relation between its phenology—the timing of seasonal activities such as flowering or breeding—and that of species at the immediate lower level". In essence, it is a measure of reproductive success due to how well the phenology of the prey overlaps with key periods of predator demand. In ecological studies, a few examples include the timing and extent of overlap of avian reproduction with the annual phenology of their primary prey items, the interactions between herring fish reproduction and copepod spawning, the relationship between winter moth egg hatching and the timing of oak bud bursting, and the relationship between herbivore reproductive phenology with pulses in nutrients in vegetation.

== Match ==
Arctic habitats provide an exceptional area in the summer months for migrating birds looking to breed. In many areas there is an abundance of seasonal arthropods, an extended duration of a 24-hour photoperiod, and a general scarcity of predators.Shorebirds and Passerines are two of the most speciose groups of birds that rely heavily on the presence of surface swarming Arthropods. The shorebirds are a very precocial group of animals that can all move around and feed for themselves on the day they hatch. In contrast most Passerines are altricial, and captured arthropods are provisioned by parents until they get reach maturity and gain independence.

The insects of this region are also characterized by having a very short period of conspicuous activity. Many of them overwinter as larvae burrowed in the sediment in a state of diapause, waiting for the snow to melt and the ice to free from the ponds. Once clear, the animals can continue their development, that can take as long as 7 years. Animals in their final year of development will pupate after a short feeding period and will form large ephemeral mating swarms in which copulation will occur. Shortly after oviposition will take place and the adult will then die.

Many arctic breeding waders migrate from areas where abundant calorie rich crustaceans are not a limiting factor in their development and fat storage. These aforementioned emerging arthropods' timing must be highly correlated with the laying of a migrating birds nest to allow for optimal success of the brood. Waders are under extreme physiological stress from the migration which requires them to inflate their breast muscles in preparation, as well as shrinking their digestive systems. These are birds that use an income breeding strategy, and so upon arrival do not have sufficient stores of fat to begin ovulation. Upon reaching the arctic, they must rebuild their digestive systems and be physiologically prepared to meet formidable conditions. This requires them to find an abundant prey source, and capitalize on it before they will be capable of laying a clutch.

If the bird arrives with sufficient time to recover these expended resources and lay their clutch with enough time to hatch at the period that prey density is going to be at its best, they will greatly increase the likelihood that those offspring are going to be given sufficient time to develop before they are forced back out of the arctic. If not, they risk a higher likelihood of nest depredation and a greater chance that the chicks will not have enough time to develop, and thus unable to fly independently back to a more temperate climate.

== Mismatch ==
The complications of global changes such as climate change and other human activities are far from being thoroughly understood. We now understand what our actions are doing to the planet, but are still working out the details on the myriad ways in which our actions are disrupting our ecosystems. Almost all published examples of tropic mismatch are linked to climate change However, human activities have impacted ecosystems globally an some of those activities could instigate trophic mismatch. A seminal example of human-mediated trophic mismatch that is globally relevant is between fire driven resource pulses and herbivore reproductive demands. Humans have shifted fire season which shifted the resource pulse in vegation such that it no longer coincides with herbivore reproductive demands. Importantly, it is highly likely that human-mediated trophic mismatch is common, but additional research identifying when and why they occur is needed.

Above the 60 degree latitude line, temperatures are expected to be raised by 2.5 °C by the middle of the 21st century. It is also projected that the annual mean air temperature will increase by 1 °C by 2020, 2 to 3 °C by 2050, and 4 to 5 °C by 2080. Our current scientific understand still has a long way to go to truly understand the implications for these projections.

Top predators must coordinate their activities with their immediate lower prey on the trophic exchange. A good example of arising mismatch is the winter moth which has a rather unusual life cycle that is highly in tuned with its environment. As an adult, it awakes in the cold hardy month of November, mates, and then crawls back up the oak tree that it was undergoing its metamorphosis in to lay eggs that will then enter a state of diapause. Those eggs will begin developing in February and continue for several months before they hit a crucial point where they will want to hatch. This date of hatching is very important, because if they hatch as little as 5 days too early, they will starve to death. Also, if they hatch two weeks too late, the leaves of the oak tree that they so desperately rely on will have achieved tannin concentrations so high that it will not properly nourish the animals. This may seem like a trivial difference, but it will draw out the animals' duration of which it is forced to feed and leaves it susceptible to further predation and parasitization risk. In recent years this is exactly what has been observed and the mechanisms relied upon for the phenology of each organism's respective issues is being altered by a change in the weather pattern and which aspect each responds to.

== Exceptions ==
Originally, the MMH was thought to apply only to specialist feeders, reliant on a single prey item, although it can also be driven by the nutritional quality of varying prey items. For example, most examples of a match or mismatch rely on predator fitness that is dependent on a single resource. However, even more generalist species can suffer from phenological and/or nutritional mismatch if their main food source is highly seasonal or varies in quality throughout key periods of the annual cycle such as reproduction. For example, the European pied flycatcher provisions their offspring more flying insects during periods of low caterpillar abundance, but this negatively affects offspring condition. In contrast, the generalist diet of the wood warbler Phylloscopus sibilatrix is also thought to be why no effect was observed in a mis-match between peak caterpillar biomass and breeding success. Also, the predators and the prey must be relying on different abiotic cues. Typical instances also have the predator relying on an annually fixed abiotic cue, and the prey tends to use a cue that varies year to year (see above citations).

== See also ==
- Hydrographic containment
