= Carla Cáceres =

Ecologists

Carla Eva Cáceres
- Education: Cornell University
- Scientific career
- Workplaces: University of Illinois
- Thesis: Egg bank dynamics and daphnid species diversity in Oneida Lake, New York (1997)
- Doctoral advisor: Nelson G. Hairston, Jr.

Carla Cáceres is a professor at the University of Illinois Urbana-Champaign known for her research in population, community and evolutionary ecology, focusing on the origins, maintenance, and functional significance of biodiversity within ecosystems. She is a Fellow of the American for the Advancement of Science, the Ecological Society of America, and the Association for the Sciences of Limnology and Oceanography.

== Education and career ==
Cáceres' interest in freshwater ecology was evident by the age of eight when she was collecting organisms from bodies of water near her house and looking at them under a microscope. While an undergraduate at the University of Michigan she did her honor's thesis in John Lehman's laboratory on plankton found in Lake Michigan which led to co-authorship on a paper that was published in 1993.

She earned her B.S. in biology from the University of Michigan (1991) and earned her Ph.D. in ecology and evolutionary biology from Cornell University in 1997. From 1996 until 2001, she was an assistant professional scientist at the Illinois Natural History Survey. Cáceres started at the University of Illinois Urbana-Champaign in 1997, where she was promoted to full professor in 2012.

From 2012 to 2019, she co-directed the Orpheum Children's Museum Day Camp--"Girls Do Science!", an outreach program designed to engage young girls, grades 2nd-6th, in science activities.

== Research ==
Cáceres conducts research into eco-evolutionary feedbacks on community assembly, especially in stormwater habitats, and the community ecology of disease. Her graduate research was the first quantify the storage effect, an ecological theory defining the co-existence of species within an ecological community. Cáceres assessed how the storage effect impacted the survival of two species of water fleas, Daphnia galeata mendotae and Daphnia pulicaria- a paper which in 1999 was awarded the Raymond L. Lindeman Award by the Association for the Sciences of Limnology and Oceanography. She has also examined the role of dormancy on the survival of Daphnia eggs, how genetic diversity in water fleas contributes to their survival in newly colonized ponds, and variability in dispersal rates across species of zooplankton.

A portion of Cáceres' research considers how disease is spread across organisms, particularly how predation increases the spread of disease and the role of increasing temperature on the growth and transmission of parasites. In 2020, Cáceres was involved in research using Dapnia pulex to assess the role of host exposure to parasitic diseases, a topic noted by the press as of potential relevance during the COVID-19 pandemic given the potential transmission of disease across animal species.

=== Selected publications ===
- Cáceres, Carla E. (19 August 1997). "Temporal variation, dormancy, and coexistence: A field test of the storage effect". Proceedings of the National Academy of Sciences. 94 (17): 9171–9175. Bibcode:1997PNAS...94.9171C. doi:10.1073/pnas.94.17.9171. PMC 23092. PMID 11038565.
- Cáceres, Carla E. (1998). "Interspecific Variation in the Abundance, Production, and Emergence of Daphnia Diapausing Eggs". Ecology. 79 (5): 1699–1710. doi:10.1890/0012-9658(1998)079[1699:IVITAP]2.0.CO;2. ISSN 1939-9170.
- Cáceres, Carla E.; Soluk, Daniel A. (1 May 2002). "Blowing in the wind: a field test of overland dispersal and colonization by aquatic invertebrates". Oecologia. 131 (3): 402–408. Bibcode:2002Oecol.131..402C. doi:10.1007/s00442-002-0897-5. ISSN 1432-1939. PMID 28547712. S2CID 9941895.
- Cáceres, Carla E.; Knight, Christine J.; Hall, Spencer R. (2009). "Predator–spreaders: Predation can enhance parasite success in a planktonic host–parasite system". Ecology. 90 (10): 2850–2858. doi:10.1890/08-2154.1. ISSN 1939-9170. PMID 19886493.
- Colbourne, J. K.; Pfrender, M. E.; Gilbert, D.; Thomas, W. K.; Tucker, A.; Oakley, T. H.; Tokishita, S.; Aerts, A.; Arnold, G. J.; Basu, M. K.; Bauer, D. J.; Caceres, C. E.; Carmel, L.; Casola, C.; Choi, J.-H.; Detter, J. C.; Dong, Q.; Dusheyko, S.; Eads, B. D.; Frohlich, T.; Geiler-Samerotte, K. A.; Gerlach, D.; Hatcher, P.; Jogdeo, S.; Krijgsveld, J.; Kriventseva, E. V.; Kultz, D.; Laforsch, C.; Lindquist, E.; Lopez, J.; Manak, J. R.; Muller, J.; Pangilinan, J.; Patwardhan, R. P.; Pitluck, S.; Pritham, E. J.; Rechtsteiner, A.; Rho, M.; Rogozin, I. B.; Sakarya, O.; Salamov, A.; Schaack, S.; Shapiro, H.; Shiga, Y.; Skalitzky, C.; Smith, Z.; Souvorov, A.; Sung, W.; Tang, Z.; Tsuchiya, D.; Tu, H.; Vos, H.; Wang, M.; Wolf, Y. I.; Yamagata, H.; Yamada, T.; Ye, Y.; Shaw, J. R.; Andrews, J.; Crease, T. J.; Tang, H.; Lucas, S. M.; Robertson, H. M.; Bork, P.; Koonin, E. V.; Zdobnov, E. M.; Grigoriev, I. V.; Lynch, M.; Boore, J. L. (4 February 2011). "The Ecoresponsive Genome of Daphnia pulex". Science. 331 (6017): 555–561. Bibcode:2011Sci...331..555C. doi:10.1126/science.1197761. PMC 3529199. PMID 21292972.

== Awards and honors ==
- Raymond L. Lindeman Award, Association for the Sciences of Limnology and Oceanography (1999) for Cáceres (1997) paper
- Presidential Early Career Award for Scientists and Engineers (PECASE) (2003)
- Sustaining fellow, Association for the Sciences of Limnology and Oceanography (2015)
- Fellow, Ecological Society of America (2016)
- Fellow, American Association for the Advancement of Science (2017)
