= D. commutata =

D. commutata may refer to:

- Daphnia commutata, a water flea
- Dicranota commutata, a hairy-eyed cranefly
- Drepanogynis commutata, a geometer moth
