= Daphnia lumholtzi =

Scientific classification
- Kingdom: Animalia
- Phylum: Arthropoda
- Clade: Pancrustacea
- Class: Branchiopoda
- Order: Anomopoda
- Family: Daphniidae
- Genus: Daphnia
- Subgenus: Daphnia
- Species: D. lumholtzi

Binomial name
- Daphnia lumholtzi G. O. Sars, 1885

Species of small freshwater animal

Daphnia lumholtzi is a species of small, invasive water fleas that originates in the tropical and subtropical lakes of Africa, Asia, and Australia. As an invasive species, Daphnia lumholtzi disrupts aquatic habitats by spreading throughout the warmer waters of lakes and reservoirs.

== Description ==
Daphnia lumholtzi is a small crustacean that is 2–3 mm in length. It has a large helmet and a long tail spine, usually longer than the length of its body, that fluctuates in size. Its body structure is arched, extending to a sharp point. There are roughly 10 prominent spines on the margin of the abdominal shield covering.

== Ecology ==
=== Temperature ===
Daphnia lumholtzi is typically found in the warm, shallow regions of bodies of water with larger surface areas. While most species of Daphnia see high mortality at temperatures greater than 25 °C, D. lumholtzi individuals can survive and reproduce at temperatures up to 30 °C, with a thermal optimum occurring at 29 °C. Studies have shown that population density and water surface temperature are positively correlated. Once favorable temperatures are reached, such as those in the late summer, the previously deposited eggs hatch. The lower temperature range of D. lumholtzi extends to 5 °C, where some individuals are able to survive, with survival increasing significantly at 10 °C and reproduction beginning to occur at 15 °C. This significantly broad temperature range in which D. lumholtzi can survive has led to it being labeled a eurythermal species.

=== Behavior ===
Both adult and juvenile D. lumholtzi exhibit a vertical migration pattern, moving upward as the sun sets and downward as the sun rises. This behavior leads to large population densities close to the water surface at night and also occurs in the absence of a suggested predator threat.

=== Diet ===
Daphnia lumhotzi mostly feeds on phytoplankton ranging from 1 to 25 micrometers in size, but will also eat foods that contain organic detritus, bacteria, and protists which provide an excellent source of nutrients.

=== Dispersal ===
Daphnia lumholtzi was originally restricted to the tropical lake and pond regions of southwest Asia, Australia, and most of Africa. The exact location of geographic origin in the United States has not been identified, but scientists believe the introduction of exotic African fish to lakes most likely caused the distribution. It was first detected in Missouri and Texas reservoirs in 1991 and has since been found in more than 16 states and over 125 lakes and reservoirs. Studies have shown that the ability of D. lumholtzi to disperse widely is most likely due to human activity. Heavy boat traffic on lakes and reservoirs during warmer seasons when D. lumholtzi thrive enable them to expand into other nearby bodies of water. The long spines and hairs on eggs act as hooks and enable attachment to boats, facilitating dispersal. The presence of D. lumholtzi in smaller ponds is atypical; however it is unlikely that non-human dispersal mechanisms, such as smaller invertebrates moving between bodies of water, have contributed to its widespread distribution.

=== Reproduction ===
Daphnia lumholtzi deposits eggs in lake sediment that can remain dormant for long periods of time. The eggs are characterized by long spines and hairs that act as hooks. Ephippia are protective shells that cover the egg until favorable conditions occur, such as warmer temperatures or a larger amount of resources. These ephippia are able to survive in environmental conditions, including oxygen, salinity, and temperature ranges, that are inhospitable to adult daphnids, although exact ranges for D. lumholtzi ephippia have not been found. This ephippia stage is an example of diapause, a state of suspended animation an organism can enter in order to survive a harsh environment. D. lumholtzi is capable of producing 10 times more ephippia than other daphnid species. In temperatures above the optimal temperature for reproduction, 25 °C, the rate of egg development decreases. In temperatures below 25 °C, egg development slows.

=== Predators ===
The main predators of D. lumholtzi are fish and small invertebrate species. Larger fish are almost always successful in their encounters with D. lumholtzi. Small invertebrate predators are less efficient than large fish in catching D. lumholtzi.

== Physiology ==
Being an invasive species, the physiology of D. lumholtzi is relatively well studied for a daphnid.

=== Respiration ===
Daphnia lumholtzi individuals prefer areas with high levels of dissolved oxygen and avoid areas where oxygen levels are low. Population surveys have found robust D. lumholtzi populations in water with oxygen saturation levels ranging from 65-163%, while no populations were found in water with saturation levels ranging from 7-50%. The mechanism D. lumholtzi uses for respiration is very similar to that used by other species of Daphnia, with gas exchange occurring through gills that are fed oxygenated water by appendages on the thorax.

=== Response to salinity ===
As with most other members of the order Cladocera, D. lumholtzi lives in freshwater and is hyperosmotic to its environment. D. lumholtzi is generally found in habitats with a salinity near 0 grams per liter, but can withstand slightly saline water, up to 1.5 grams per liter, for short amounts of time. This ability to survive short bouts of salinity has likely contributed to D. lumholtzi’s ability to invade North America.

== As an invasive species ==
Daphnia lumholtzi exhibits higher survivorship and reproduction in the late summer, under high heat conditions, when compared to other crustaceans living in these conditions. It has been suggested that D. lumholtzi’s more tropical origins may have enabled it to live in these higher temperatures due to evolutionary changes that resulted in enzymes that are better adapted to the heat. This advantage allows them to be a better competitor and ultimately out-compete other species, specifically native zooplankton species, within the same habitat and come out as a successful invader. In accordance with the competitive exclusion principle, no other species can inhabit the same late summer niche as D. lumholtzi; another factor that allows it to have higher survivorship than other Daphnia species and is ultimately a better invader. However, high survivorship and reproduction are not the only factors that make D. lumholtzi an invasive species.

Competition between D. lumholtzi is increased in habitats that favor the high light intensity of shallow waters. D. lumholtzi showed greater survivorship than other Daphnia species (specifically D. pulex), which made them a stronger competitor for light reception and resources in bodies of water receiving high light intensity. It was found to out-compete other species in areas with high light intensity which in turn contributes to its invasive success.

Daphnia lumholtzi is capable of producing 10 times more ephippia than other daphnid species, which can remain dormant until favorable conditions occur. This egg bank gives them an advantage over other species whose eggs cannot withstand desiccation or lower temperatures, enabling them to produce more offspring that survive longer. The reproductive rate also increases with a higher concentration of food. Areas exhibiting high food abundance will therefore attract more D. lumholtzi, and in turn result in a higher rate of reproduction. The greater number of offspring puts pressure on the habitat’s resources and other competitors.

Daphnia lumholtzi is highly plastic, meaning it has the ability to morphologically adapt to factors within the environment by developing structures that enable it to successfully avoid predation. A long tail spine, large helmet, and additional spines on the abdomen are produced in response to predator kairomones, which are predator hormones, within the water. D. lumholtzi does not produce these protective structures when there are no predators present, and looks morphologically similar to other Daphnia species. When predators are detected, D. lumholtzi responds by producing a tail spine, helmet, abdomen spines for protection; other Daphnia species do not adapt this way to predator threats. With the development of these morphological features, predators have a more difficult time preying on D. lumholtzi. This excess energy the predators put into eating D. lumholtzi lessens predator efficiency, making the predators more likely to choose another prey. This prey-switching puts an extra strain on other native zooplankton species, reducing predation on D. lumholtzi and allowing it to outperform other competitors.

== Control ==
Eradication of D. lumholtzi is almost impossible once it has invaded a lake or reservoir. D. lumholtzi is sensitive to various pesticides and manmade chemicals, but the introduction of chemicals to natural lakes is often harmful to other species. The focus of most control measures is the prevention of initial invasion. For now, scientists recommend simple practices, such as thorough cleaning of boats and avoiding aquarium water dumps, to slow the spread of the species.
