= Ephippia =

Eggs of small crustacea

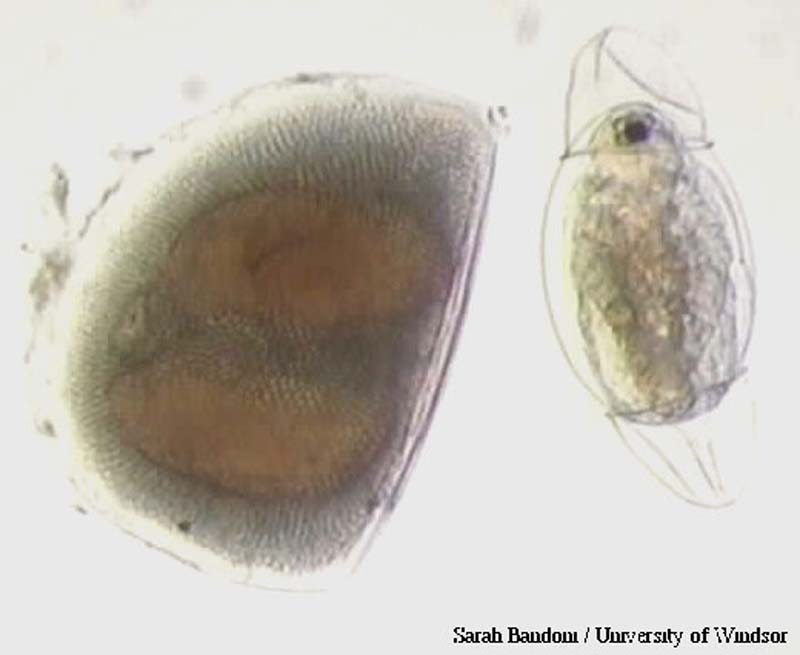
Resting egg pouch (ephippium) and the juvenile daphnid that just hatched from it

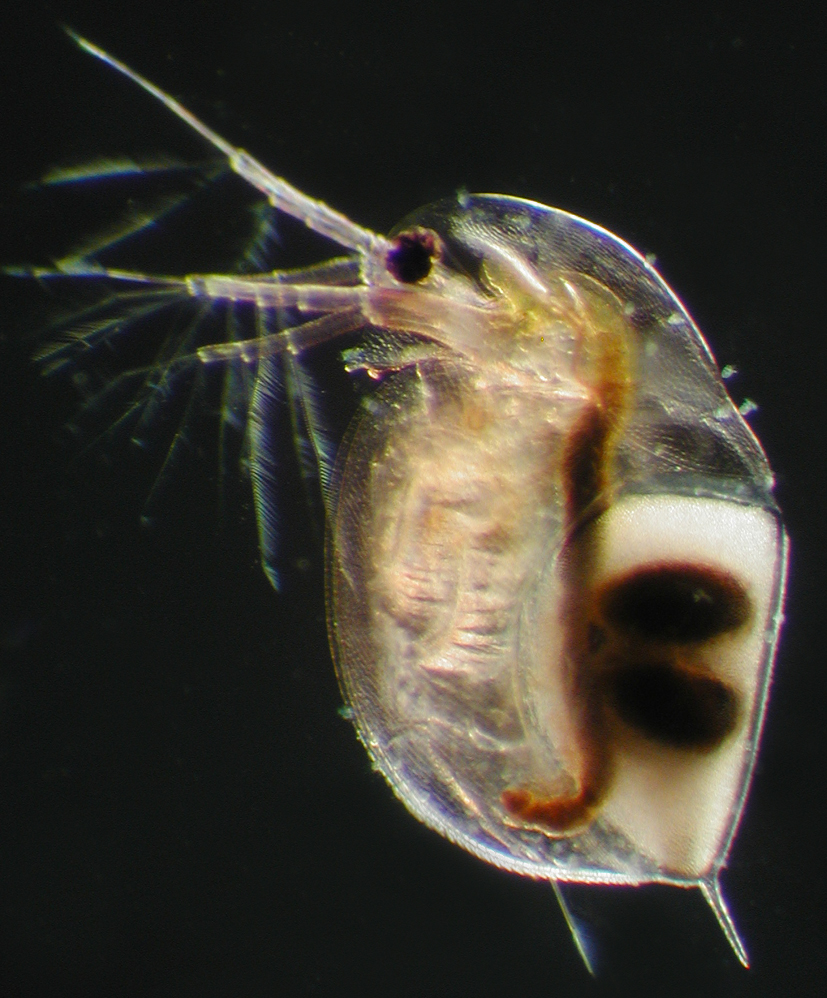
Female Daphnia longispina carrying a resting egg (ephippium). The two dark, oval spots on the ephippium mark the places where the two resting eggs are located. The female was collected in a rock pool in south-western Finland. The animal is about 2 mm long.

Schematic representation of cyclic parthenogenesis in the cladoceran Daphnia (water flea). The sexual cycle results in the production of the sexual eggs, the resting stages enclosed by the ephippium.

Ephippia (singular: ephippium) are winter or dry-season eggs of the various species of small crustacean in the order Cladocera (within the Branchiopoda); they are provided with an extra shell layer, which preserves and protects the resting stages inside from harsh environmental conditions until the more favorable times, such as spring, when the reproductive cycle is able to take place once again. Ephippia are part of the back of a mother carrying them until they are fully developed. After molting, the ephippium stays in the water, or in the soil of dried puddles, small ponds, and vernal pools. The resting stages are often called eggs, but are in fact embryos with arrested development. Ephippia can rest for many years before the embryo resumes development upon an appropriate hatching stimulus.

== See also ==
- Bythotrephes longimanus (invasive species)
- Cercopagis pengoi (invasive species)
- Daphnia
  - Daphnia longispina
  - Daphnia lumholtzi (invasive species)
  - Daphnia magna (large species)
  - Daphnia pulex (small, most common)
- Moina (smallest)
