= Hydrographic containment =

Concept of fisheries oceanography

Hydrographic containment is a concept in fisheries oceanography that refers to the way a fish population utilizes different tides and currents at different times to remain in a certain region. This concept was developed based on Harden Jones' triangle of migration. This refers to the idea that fish migrate from their spawning grounds to their nursery ground. Then from the nursery grounds, they join the adult population of fish at the feeding ground. Finally, the fish returns to the spawning grounds to spawn.

The process of hydrographic containment typically works in this way: Fish migrate from their feeding grounds to their spawning grounds using selective tidal transport or a current/counter-current system to move against a stream of water. The fish population then releases their larvae into the same current and the larvae drift to their nursery grounds in shallower waters while the spent adults are carried back in the stream they arrived in. After a certain period of time, the juvenile fish migrate from the nursery grounds to the feeding grounds. These two migrations, the mature adults back to the spawning grounds and the immature fish from the nursery grounds to the feeding grounds, make up the identity of the fish stock. Different stocks of fish carry out this migration pattern differently to minimize the loss of larvae and juveniles to waters unsuitable for survival and make sure that the juveniles arrive at an optimal nursery habitat.

This process has been well documented in plaice of the North Sea. The North Sea plaice gather over a modest region in the southwest corner of the North Sea to spawn, some fish traveling vast distances to arrive at this location. The almost certain reason the plaice choose this region for spawning is because the drift of the larvae from the English Channel will bring them from their spawning grounds in the southwest corner to the entry of the Dutch Wadden Sea, an optimal juvenile rearing habitat, right as the plaice reach their juvenile life phase.

== See also ==
- Match/mismatch
