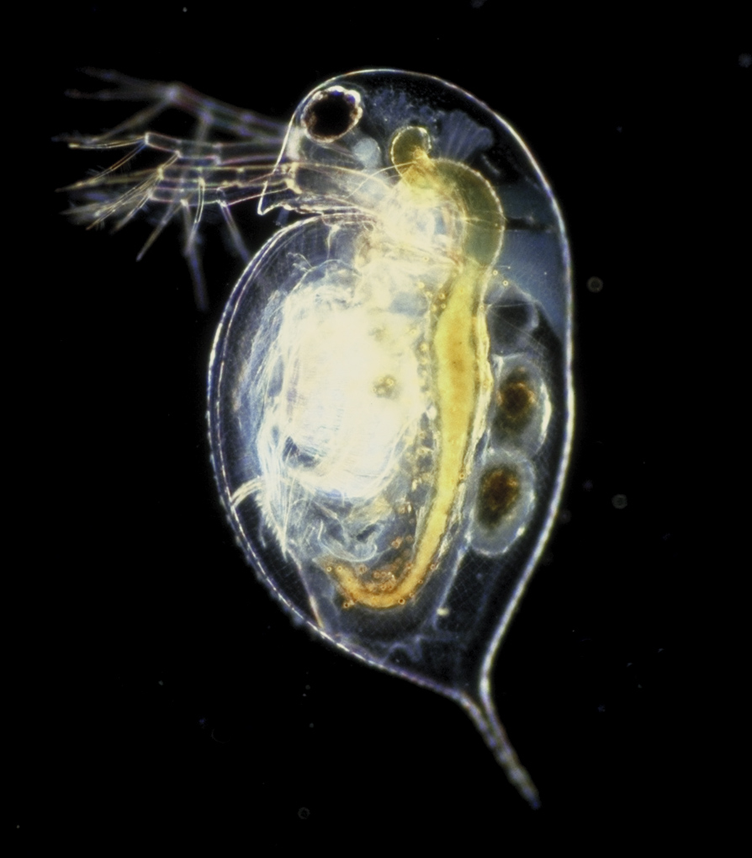
- Daphnia (Daphnia) pulex

Scientific classification
- Domain: Eukaryota
- Kingdom: Animalia
- Phylum: Arthropoda
- Class: Branchiopoda
- Order: Anomopoda
- Family: Daphniidae
- Genus: Daphnia
- Subgenus: Daphnia; O. F. Müller, 1785

= Daphnia (Daphnia) =

Subgenus of small freshwater animals

Daphnia is one of the three subgenera of the genus Daphnia, the others being Australodaphnia and Ctenodaphnia.

== Species ==
- Daphnia ambigua Scourfield, 1947
- Daphnia arenata Hebert, 1995
- Daphnia catawba Coker, 1926
- Daphnia cavicervix Ekman, 1900
- Daphnia cheraphila Hebert & Finston, 1996
- Daphnia commutata Ekman, 1900
- Daphnia cristata Sars, 1862
- Daphnia cucullata Sars, 1862
- Daphnia curvirostris Eylmann, 1887
- Daphnia dentifera Forbes, 1893
- Daphnia dubia Herrick, 1883
- Daphnia galeata Sars, 1864
- Daphnia gessneri Herbst, 1967
- Daphnia hyalina Leydig, 1860
- Daphnia lacustris Sars, 1862
- Daphnia laevis Birge, 1879
- Daphnia latispina Kořínek & Hebert, 1996
- Daphnia longiremis Sars, 1862
- Daphnia longispina (O. F. Müller, 1776)
- Daphnia lumholtzi Sars, 1885
- Daphnia marcahuasensis (Valdivia Villar & Burger, 1989)
- Daphnia melanica Hebert, 1995
- Daphnia mendotae Birge, 1918
- Daphnia middendorffiana Fischer, 1851
- Daphnia minnehaha Herrick, 1884
- Daphnia morsei Ishikawa, 1895
- Daphnia neoobtusa Hebert, 1995
- Daphnia obtusa Kurz, 1874
- Daphnia oregonensis Kořínek & Hebert, 1996
- Daphnia parvula Fordyce, 1901
- Daphnia peruviana Harding, 1955
- Daphnia pileata Hebert & Finston, 1996
- Daphnia prolata Hebert & Finston, 1996
- Daphnia pulex Leydig, 1860
- Daphnia pulicaria Forbes, 1893
- Daphnia retrocurva Forbes, 1882
- Daphnia rosea Sars, 1862
- Daphnia sinevi Kotov, Ishida & Taylor, 2006
- Daphnia tanakai Ishida, Kotov & Taylor, 2006
- Daphnia thorata Forbes, 1893
- Daphnia turbinata Sars, 1903
- Daphnia umbra Taylor et al., 1996
- Daphnia villosa Kořínek & Hebert, 1996

A number of species inquirendae are also included in the subgenus:

- Daphnia arcuata Forbes, 1893
- Daphnia arenaria Forbes, 1893
- Daphnia bairdii Forest, 1879
- Daphnia caudata Sars, 1863
- Daphnia caudata Sars, 1863
- Daphnia clathrata Forbes, 1893
- Daphnia denticulata Birge, 1879
- Daphnia elongata Woltereck, 1932
- Daphnia ezoensis Uéno, 1972
- Daphnia frigidolimnetica Ekman, 1904
- Daphnia gibbera Kortchagin, 1887
- Daphnia intexta Forbes, 1890
- Daphnia latipalpa Moniez, 1888
- Daphnia litoralis Sars, 1890
- Daphnia macraocula Kiser, 1950
- Daphnia mitsukuri Ishikawa, 1896
- Daphnia monacha (Brehm, 1912)
- Daphnia nasuta Herrick, 1884
- Daphnia parapulex Woltereck, 1932
- Daphnia propinqua Sars, 1895
- Daphnia pulicarioides Burckhardt, 1899
- Daphnia pulicoides Woltereck, 1932
- Daphnia schmackeri Poppe, 1890
- Daphnia schoedleri Sars, 1862
- Daphnia sonkulensis Manujlova, 1964
- Daphnia titicacensis Birge, 1909
- Daphnia typica Mackin, 1931
- Daphnia ventrosa Kortchagin, 1887
- Daphnia whitmani Ishikawa, 1896
- Daphnia zschokkei Stingelin, 1894
