= Daphnia commutata =

Scientific classification
- Domain: Eukaryota
- Kingdom: Animalia
- Phylum: Arthropoda
- Class: Branchiopoda
- Order: Anomopoda
- Family: Daphniidae
- Genus: Daphnia
- Subgenus: Daphnia
- Species: D. commutata

Binomial name
- Daphnia commutata Ekman, 1900

Species of small freshwater animal

Daphnia commutata is a species of water flea.
