= Journal of Plankton Research =

- Discipline: Plankton research
- Language: English
- Edited by: Beatrix E. Beisner

Publication details
- History: 1979-present
- Publisher: Oxford University Press
- Frequency: Bimonthly
- Impact factor: 2.209 (2018)

Standard abbreviations
- ISO 4: J. Plankton Res.

Indexing
- ISSN: 0142-7873 (print); 1464-3774 (web)
- LCCN: 79643456
- OCLC no.: 1027903027

Links
- Journal homepage; Online access

The Journal of Plankton Research is a bimonthly peer-reviewed scientific journal covering research on plankton. It is published by Oxford University Press and the editor-in-chief is Beatrix E. Beisner (Université du Québec à Montréal). According to the Journal Citation Reports, the journal has a 2018 impact factor of 2.209.
