= Recruitment (biology) =

Three biological processes

When discussing population dynamics, behavioral ecology, and cell biology, recruitment refers to several different biological processes. In population dynamics, recruitment is the process by which new individuals are added to a population, whether by birth and maturation or by immigration. When discussing behavioral ecology and animal communication, recruitment is communication that is intended to add members of a group to specific tasks. Finally, when discussing cell biology, recruitment is the process by which cells are selected for certain tasks.

== Recruitment in population dynamics ==
=== Definition and importance ===
In population dynamics and community ecology, recruitment is the process by which individuals are added to a population. Successful recruitment is contingent on an individual surviving and integrating within the population; in some studies, individuals are only considered to have been recruited into a population once they've reached a certain size or life stage. Recruitment can be hard to assess due to the multitude of factors that affect it, such as predation, birth, and dispersal rates and environmental factors like temperature, precipitation, and natural disturbances. Recruitment rates in turn affect population size and demographics. High recruitment may increase a species' current and future abundance within a system, whereas low recruitment can lead to reduced current and future abundance.

=== Common study systems ===
==== Aquatic systems ====
Recruitment can be an important factor in predicting future population growth potential. For this reason, and due to their economic importance, recruitment has commonly been studied in fishery systems. While experimental work has been done in aquatic systems, dozens of papers have been published in the last few decades to model recruitment in both marine and freshwater aquatic environments.

==== Forest systems ====
Experimental studies on the effects of recruitment are numerous in forest and annual plant systems.

== Recruitment in behavioral ecology ==
In behavioral ecology and studies of animal communication, recruitment is the process by which individuals in a social group direct other individuals to do certain tasks. This is often achieved through the use of recruitment pheromones that direct anywhere from one to several hundred individuals to important resources, like food or nesting sites. Recruitment is practiced in a wide variety of eusocial taxa, most notably in hymenoptera (the ants, bees, and wasps) and termites but also in social caterpillars, beetles, and even a species of naked mole rats (Heterocephalus glaber).
