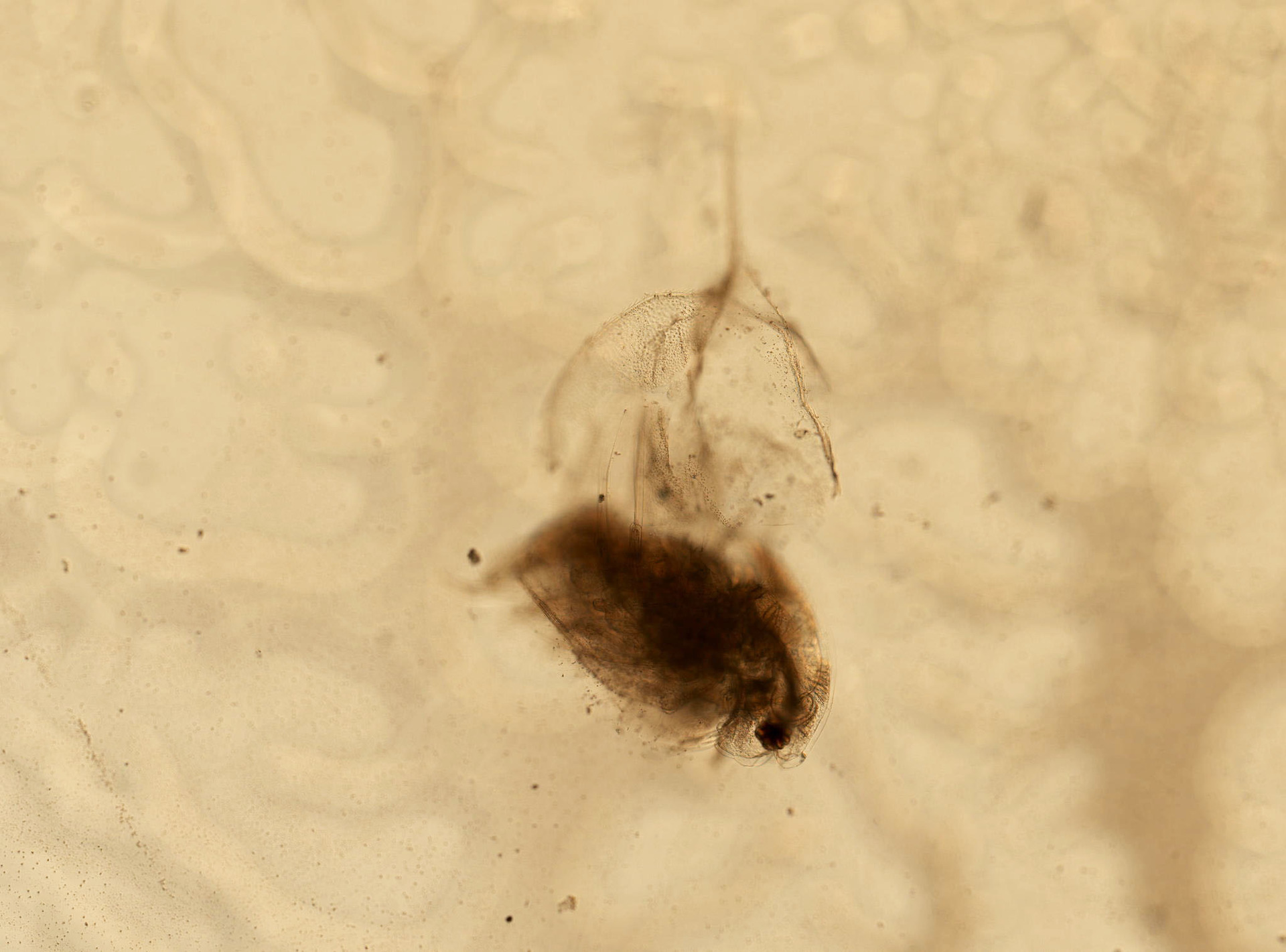

Scientific classification
- Domain: Eukaryota
- Kingdom: Animalia
- Phylum: Arthropoda
- Class: Branchiopoda
- Order: Anomopoda
- Family: Daphniidae
- Genus: Daphnia
- Subgenus: Daphnia
- Species: D. galeata

Binomial name
- Daphnia galeata G. O. Sars, 1864

Subspecies
- D. g. galeata G. O. Sars, 1864; D. g. mendotae Birge, 1918

= Daphnia galeata =

Species of crustacean

Daphnia galeata is a small species of planktonic crustaceans. It lives in freshwater environments across a large area of the Northern Hemisphere, mostly in lakes.

D. galeata comprises two subspecies: D. g. galeata, found in the Old World, and D. g. mendotae, named after Lake Mendota near Madison, Wisconsin, in the New World. D. g. mendotae may be a homoploid hybrid taxon. In the lower Great Lakes, the populations are mostly hybrids of the European and American subspecies.
