= Interspecific competition =

Ecological competition between different species

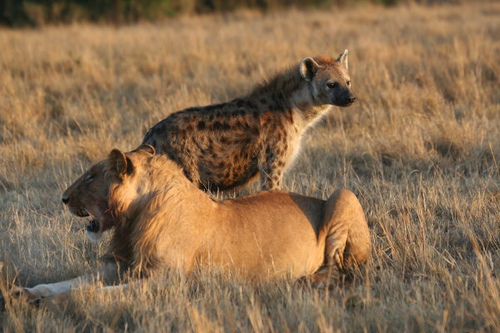
Subadult male lion and female spotted hyena in the Masai Mara. The two species share the same ecological niche, and are thus in competition with each other.

Interspecific competition, in ecology, is a form of competition in which individuals of different species compete for the same resources in an ecosystem (e.g. food or living space). This can be contrasted with mutualism, a type of symbiosis. Competition between members of the same species is called intraspecific competition.

If a tree species in a dense forest grows taller than surrounding tree species, it is able to absorb more of the incoming sunlight. However, less sunlight is then available for the trees that are shaded by the taller tree, thus interspecific competition. Leopards and lions can also be in interspecific competition, since both species feed on the same prey, and can be negatively impacted by the presence of the other because they will have less food.

Competition is only one of many interacting biotic and abiotic factors that affect community structure. Moreover, competition is not always a straightforward, direct, interaction. Interspecific competition may occur when individuals of two separate species share a limiting resource in the same area. If the resource cannot support both populations, then lowered fecundity, growth, or survival may result in at least one species. Interspecific competition has the potential to alter populations, communities and the evolution of interacting species. On an individual organism level, competition can occur as interference or exploitative competition.

== Types ==
All of the types described here can also apply to intraspecific competition, that is, competition among individuals within a species. Also, any specific example of interspecific competition can be described in terms of both a mechanism (e.g., resource or interference) and an outcome (symmetric or asymmetric).

=== Based on mechanism ===
Exploitative competition, also referred to as resource competition, is a form of competition in which one species consumes and either reduces or more efficiently uses a shared limiting resource and therefore depletes the availability of the resource for the other species. Thus, it is an indirect interaction because the competing species interact via a shared resource.

Interference competition is a form of competition in which individuals of one species interacts directly with individuals of another species via antagonistic displays or more aggressive behavior.

In a review and synthesis of experimental evidence regarding interspecific competition, Schoener described six specific types of mechanisms by which competition occurs, including consumptive, preemptive, overgrowth, chemical, territorial, and encounter. Consumption competition is always resource competition, but the others cannot always be regarded as exclusively exploitative or interference.

Separating the effect of resource use from that of interference is not easy. A good example of exploitative competition is found in aphid species competing over the sap in plant phloem. Each aphid species that feeds on host plant sap uses some of the resource, leaving less for competing species. In one study, Fordinae geoica was observed to out-compete F. formicaria to the extent that the latter species exhibited a reduction in survival by 84%. Another example is the one of competition for calling space in amphibians, where the calling activity of a species prevents the other one from calling in an area as wide as it would in allopatry. A last example is driving of bisexual rock lizards of genus Darevskia from their natural habitats by a daughter unisexual form; interference competition can be ruled out in this case, because parthenogenetic forms of the lizards never demonstrate aggressive behavior.

This type of competition can also be observed in forests where large trees dominate the canopy and thus allow little light to reach smaller competitors living below. These interactions have important implications for the population dynamics and distribution of both species.

=== Based on outcome ===
Scramble and contest competition refer to the relative success of competitors. Scramble competition is said to occur when each competitor is equal suppressed, either through reduction in survival or birth rates. Contest competition is said to occur when one or a few competitors are unaffected by competition, but all others suffer greatly, either through reduction in survival or birth rates. Sometimes these types of competition are referred to as symmetric (scramble) vs. asymmetric (contest) competition. Scramble and contest competition are two ends of a spectrum, of completely equal or completely unequal effects.

== Apparent competition ==
Apparent competition is actually an example of predation that alters the relative abundances of prey on the same trophic level. It occurs when two or more species in a habitat affect shared natural enemies in a higher trophic level. If two species share a common predator, for example, apparent competition can exist between the two prey items in which the presence of each prey species increases the abundance of the shared enemy, and thereby suppresses one or both prey species. This mechanism gets its name from experiments in which one prey species is removed and the second prey species increases in abundance. Investigators sometimes mistakenly attribute the increase in abundance in the second species as evidence for resource competition between prey species. It is "apparently" competition, but is in fact due to a shared predator, parasitoid, parasite, or pathogen. Notably, species competing for resources may often also share predators in nature. Interactions via resource competition and shared predation may thus often influence one another, thus making it difficult to study and predict their outcome by only studying one of them.

== Consequences ==
Many studies, including those cited previously, have shown major impacts on both individuals and populations from interspecific competition. Documentation of these impacts has been found in species from every major branch of organism. The effects of interspecific competition can also reach communities and can even influence the evolution of species as they adapt to avoid competition. This evolution may result in the exclusion of a species in the habitat, niche separation, and local extinction. The changes of these species over time can also change communities as other species must adapt.

=== Competitive exclusion ===
The competitive exclusion principle, also called "Gause's law" which arose from mathematical analysis and simple competition models states that two species that use the same limiting resource in the same way in the same space and time cannot coexist and must diverge from each other over time in order for the two species to coexist. One species will often exhibit an advantage in resource use. This superior competitor will out-compete the other with more efficient use of the limiting resource. As a result, the inferior competitor will suffer a decline in population over time. It will be excluded from the area and replaced by the superior competitor.

A well-documented example of competitive exclusion was observed to occur between Dolly Varden charr (Trout)(Salvelinus malma) and white spotted char (Trout)(S. leucomaenis) in Japan. Both of these species were morphologically similar but the former species was found primarily at higher elevations than the latter. Although there was a zone of overlap, each species excluded the other from its dominant region by becoming better adapted to its habitat over time. In some such cases, each species gets displaced into an exclusive segment of the original habitat. Because each species suffers from competition, natural selection favors the avoidance of competition in such a way.

Niche differentiation is a process by which competitive exclusion leads to differences in resource use. In some cases, niche differentiation results in spatial displacement, where species avoid direct competition by occupying different areas. However, niche differentiation can also cause other changes, such as altered behaviors or ecological roles, that help species avoid competition. If competition avoidance is possible, species may specialize in different areas of the niche, minimizing overlap and resource competition (Watts & Holekamp, 2008). For example, spotted hyenas (Crocuta crocuta) and lions (Panthera leo) in Africa share similar habitats and prey but have different hunting strategies. Hyenas use stamina to chase prey over long distances, while lions rely on ambush hunting. This difference in hunting strategies helps reduce direct competition for food (Hayward & Slotow, 2009).

Another example of niche differentiation comes from birds, where species with similar ecological requirements shift their behavior to avoid competition. In the Galapagos Islands, finch species have been observed to change their feeding habits within a few generations, adapting to new dietary resources to minimize competition. This adaptation allowed different finch species to coexist despite overlapping habitats and food sources (Kruuk, 1972). Similarly, hyenas and lions may alter their roles in the ecosystem through spatial and behavioral differentiation, helping them avoid direct conflict and share resources (Groenewald et al., 2009).

In some ecosystems, niche differentiation is influenced by third-party species or predators. For example, a keystone predator can significantly alter the behavior of competing species. Hyenas, by preying on lions or scavenging their kills, can reduce the lions' ability to dominate a territory. This helps other predators and scavengers, like cheetahs, access resources they might otherwise be excluded from (Hayward & Slotow, 2009). Additionally, in bacterial ecosystems, phage parasites have been shown to mediate coexistence between competing bacterial species by reducing the dominance of one species. This kind of interaction helps maintain biodiversity in microbial communities, which can have important implications for both medical research and ecological theory (Groenewald et al., 2009).

=== Local extinction ===
Although local extinction of one or more competitors has been less documented than niche separation or competitive exclusion, it does occur. In an experiment involving zooplankton in artificial rock pools, local extinction rates were significantly higher in areas of interspecific competition. In these cases, therefore, the negative effects are not only at the population level but also species richness of communities.

=== Impacts on communities ===
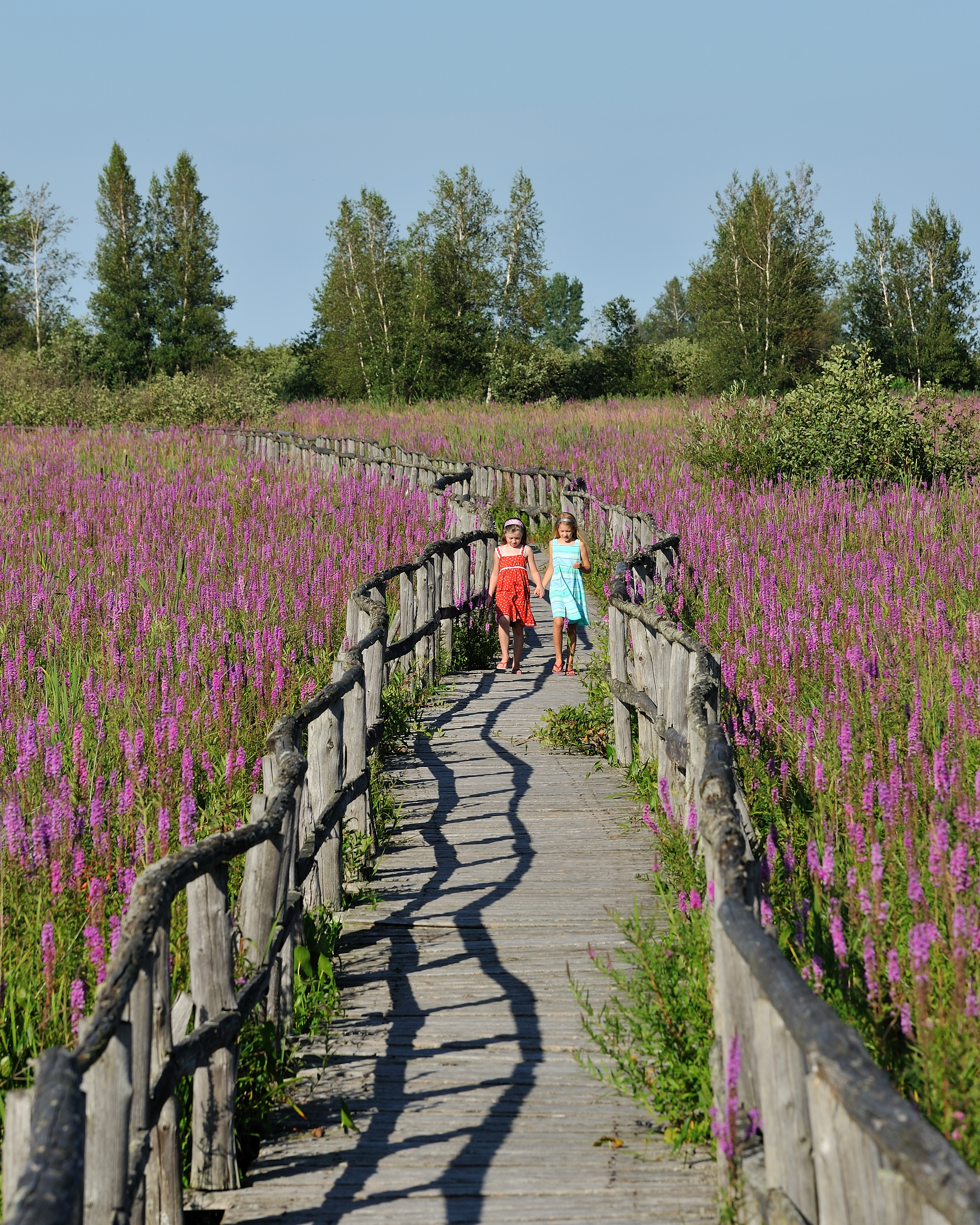
Naturalised purple-loosestrife plants growing in the Cooper Marsh Conservation Area, near Cornwall Ontario

As mentioned previously, interspecific competition has great impact on community composition and structure. Niche separation of species, local extinction and competitive exclusion are only some of the possible effects. In addition to these, interspecific competition can be the source of a cascade of effects that build on each other. An example of such an effect is the introduction of an invasive species to the United States, purple-loosestrife. This plant when introduced to wetland communities often outcompetes much of the native flora and decreases species richness, food and shelter to many other species at higher trophic levels. In this way, one species can influence the populations of many other species as well as through a myriad of other interactions. Because of the complicated web of interactions that make up every ecosystem and habitat, the results of interspecific competition are complex and site-specific.

== Competitive Lotka–Volterra model ==
The impacts of interspecific competition on populations have been formalized in a mathematical model called the Competitive Lotka–Volterra equations, which creates a theoretical prediction of interactions. It combines the effects of each species on the other. These effects are calculated separately for the first and second population respectively:

$${dN_1\over dt}=r_1 N_1 {K_1-N_1-\alpha N_2\over K_1}$$
$${dN_2\over dt}=r_2 N_2 {K_2-N_2-\beta N_1\over K_2}$$

In these formulae, N is the population size, t is time, K is the carrying capacity, r is the intrinsic rate of increase and α and β are the relative competition coefficients. The results show the effect that the other species has on the species being calculated. The results can be graphed to show a trend and possible prediction for the future of the species. One problem with this model is that certain assumptions must be made for the calculation to work. These include the lack of migration and constancy of the carrying capacities and competition coefficients of both species. The complex nature of ecology determines that these assumptions are rarely true in the field but the model provides a basis for improved understanding of these important concepts.

An equivalent formulation of these models is:

$${dN_1\over dt}=r_1 N_1 \left(1-\alpha_{11}N_1-\alpha_{12} N_2\right)$$
$${dN_2\over dt}=r_2 N_2 \left(1-\alpha_{21}N_1-\alpha_{22} N_2\right)$$

In these formulae, $\alpha_{11}$ is the effect that an individual of species 1 has on its own population growth rate. Similarly, $\alpha_{12}$ is the effect that an individual of species 2 has on the population growth rate of species 1. One can also read this as the effect on species 1 of species 2. In comparing this formulation to the one above, we note that $\alpha_{11} = 1/K_1,~ \alpha_{22}=1/K_2$, and $\alpha_{12}=\alpha/K_1$.

Coexistence between competitors occurs when $\alpha_{11} > \alpha_{21}$ and $\alpha_{22} > \alpha_{12}$. We can translate this as coexistence occurs when the competitive strength of each species on itself is greater than on its competitor.

There are other mathematical representations that model species competition, such as using non-polynomial functions.

== Interspecific competition in macroevolution ==
Interspecific competition is a major factor in macroevolution. Darwin assumed that interspecific competition limits the number of species on Earth, as formulated in his wedge metaphor: "Nature may be compared to a surface covered with ten-thousand sharp wedges ... representing different species, all packed closely together and driven in by incessant blows, . . . sometimes a wedge of one form and sometimes another being struck; the one driven deeply in forcing out others; with the jar and shock often transmitted very far to other wedges in many lines of direction." (From Natural Selection - the "big book" from which Darwin abstracted the Origin). The question whether interspecific competition limits global biodiversity is disputed today, but analytical studies of the global Phanerozoic fossil record are in accordance with the existence of global (although not constant) carrying capacities for marine biodiversity. Interspecific competition is also the basis for Van Valen's Red Queen hypothesis, and it may underlie the positive correlation between origination and extinction rates that is seen in almost all major taxa.

In the previous examples, the macroevolutionary role of interspecific competition is that of a limiting factor of biodiversity, but interspecific competition also promotes niche differentiation and thus speciation and diversification. The impact of interspecific competition may therefore change during phases of diversity build-up, from an initial phase where positive feedback mechanisms dominate to a later phase when niche-peremption limits further increase in the number of species; a possible example for this situation is the re-diversification of marine faunas after the end-Permian mass extinction event.

== See also ==
- Minimum viable population
- Symbiosis
- Mutualism (biology)
- Macroevolution
- Red Queen hypothesis
- Early-bird effect
- Ecological release
