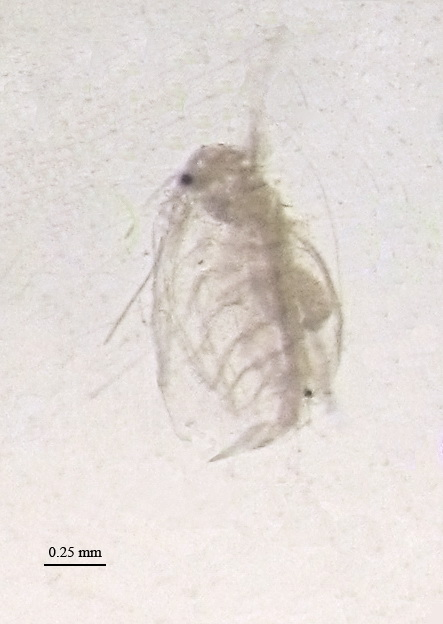

Scientific classification
- Domain: Eukaryota
- Kingdom: Animalia
- Phylum: Arthropoda
- Class: Branchiopoda
- Order: Ctenopoda
- Family: Sididae
- Genus: Penilia
- Species: P. avirostris

Binomial name
- Penilia avirostris Dana, 1849

= Penilia avirostris =

Species of small freshwater animal

Penilia avirostris is a species of ctenopod in the family Sididae. It is found in temperate Asia, Europe, and New Zealand.

== Sea Temperature Influence ==
Penilia avirostris live in waters around 18°C, but can live in waters from 12°c to 30°c. However, The increase in temperatures in the North Sea allow Penilia avirostris to thrive, having its populations dramatically grow in 2002 and 2003.
