= Diaphanosoma fluviatile =

Scientific classification
- Kingdom: Animalia
- Phylum: Arthropoda
- Clade: Pancrustacea
- Class: Branchiopoda
- Order: Ctenopoda
- Family: Sididae
- Genus: Diaphanosoma
- Species: D. fluviatile

Binomial name
- Diaphanosoma fluviatile Hansen, 1899

Species of small freshwater animal

Diaphanosoma fluviatile is a species of freshwater ctenopod in the family Sididae. Native to Central and South America, it has been found in lakes further to the north. In 2008, it was reported to have been found in central Texas. In 2018, it was reported that D. fluviatile has been found in western Lake Erie.
