= Pseudopenilia =

Scientific classification
- Domain: Eukaryota
- Kingdom: Animalia
- Phylum: Arthropoda
- Class: Branchiopoda
- Order: Ctenopoda
- Family: Pseudopenilidae; Korovchinsky & Sergeeva, 2008
- Genus: Pseudopenilia; Sergeeva, 2004
- Species: P. bathyalis

Binomial name
- Pseudopenilia bathyalis Sergeeva, 2004

Genus of small freshwater animals

Pseudopenilia bathyalis is a species of diplostracan, described in 2004, that lives at depths of 1,900–2,140 m (6,230–7,020 ft) in the anoxic zone of the Black Sea. Originally described in the family Sididae, it was transferred to its own family, the Pseudopenilidae, in 2008.
