= Aliisedimentitalea =

Scientific classification
- Domain: Bacteria
- Kingdom: Pseudomonadati
- Phylum: Pseudomonadota
- Class: Alphaproteobacteria
- Order: Rhodobacterales
- Family: Rhodobacteraceae
- Genus: Aliisedimentitalea; Kim et al. 2015

Species
- "A. scapharcae"

Genus of bacteria

"Aliisedimentitalea" is a Gram-negative and aerobic genus of bacteria from the family of Rhodobacteraceae with one known species ("Aliisedimentitalea scapharcae"). "Aliisedimentitalea scapharcae" has been isolated from the shell of Scapharca broughtonii from the South Sea in Korea.
