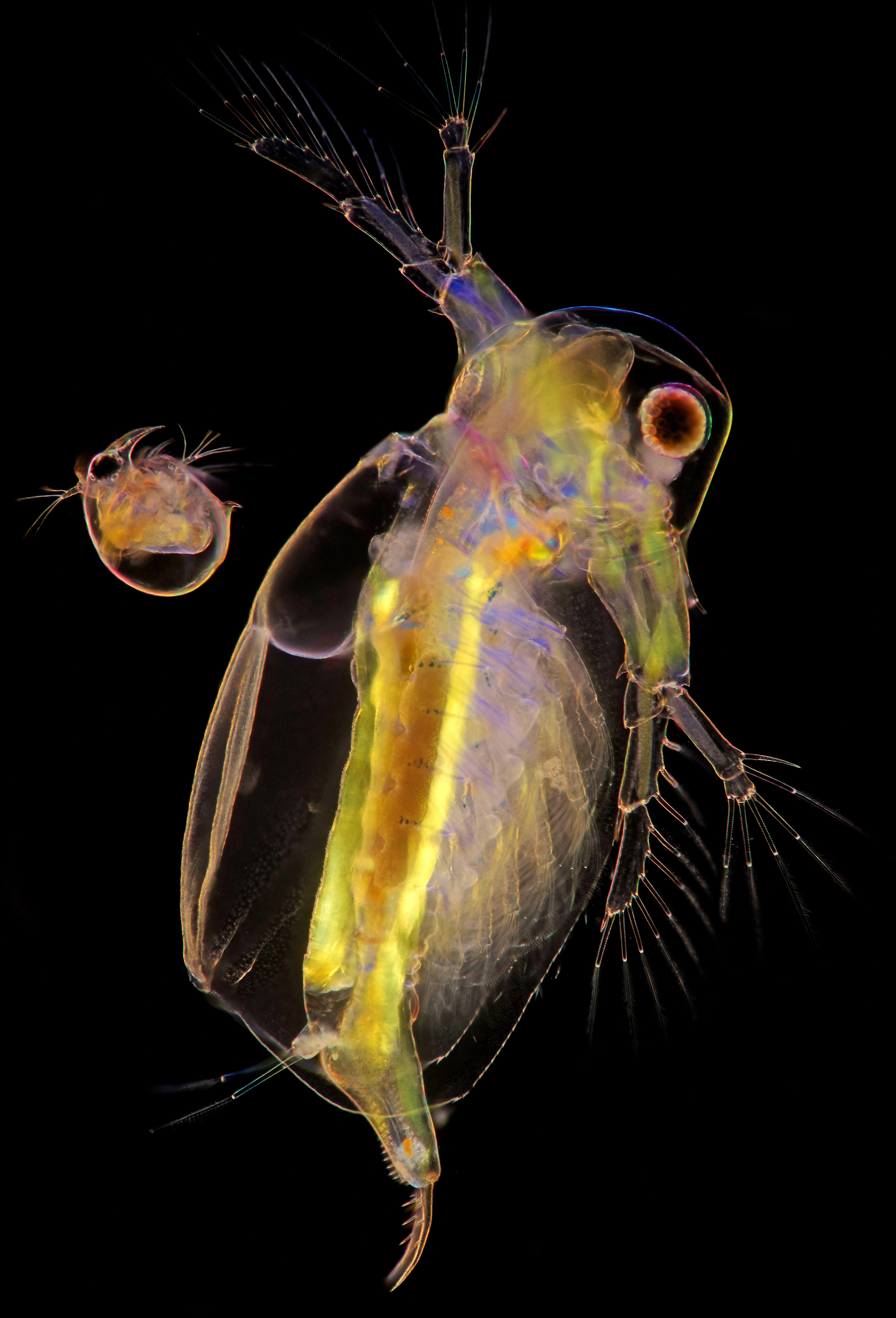
- Sida crystallina

Scientific classification
- Domain: Eukaryota
- Kingdom: Animalia
- Phylum: Arthropoda
- Class: Branchiopoda
- Order: Ctenopoda
- Family: Sididae
- Genus: Sida; Straus, 1820

= Sida (crustacean) =

Genus of small freshwater animals

Sida is a genus of ctenopods in the family Sididae. There are about five described species in Sida.

== Species ==
These five species belong to the genus Sida:

- Sida americana Korovchinsky 1979
- Sida angusta Dana 1852
- Sida aurita (Fischer, 1849)
- Sida crystallina (O. F. Müller, 1776)
- Sida ortiva Korovchinsky 1979
