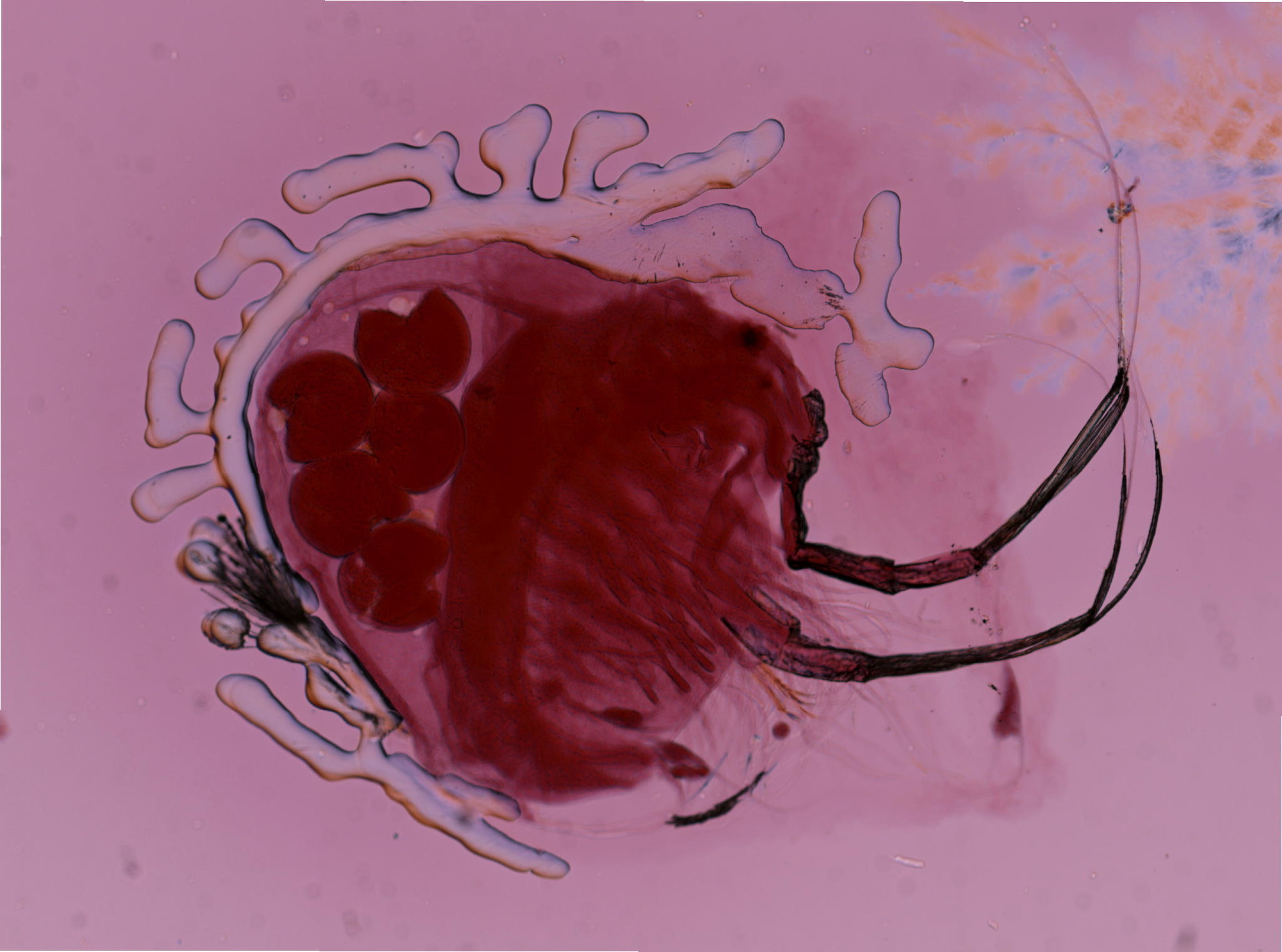

Scientific classification
- Domain: Eukaryota
- Kingdom: Animalia
- Phylum: Arthropoda
- Class: Branchiopoda
- Order: Ctenopoda
- Family: Holopediidae
- Genus: Holopedium
- Species: H. gibberum

Binomial name
- Holopedium gibberum Zaddach, 1855

= Holopedium gibberum =

Species of small freshwater animal

Holopedium gibberum is a species of water flea in the family Holopediidae, known for its gelatinous mantle. It is found in Europe, as well as in the arctic regions of North America.
