= Diaphanosoma =

Scientific classification
- Domain: Eukaryota
- Kingdom: Animalia
- Phylum: Arthropoda
- Class: Branchiopoda
- Order: Ctenopoda
- Family: Sididae
- Genus: Diaphanosoma; Fischer, 1850

Synonyms
- Daphnella Birge, 1879 (Homonym)

Genus of small freshwater animals

Diaphanosoma is a genus of Sididae.

The genus was described in 1850 by Fischer.

It has cosmopolitan distribution. In the water bodies of the world, at least 4 (or 6) species of Diaphanosoma are non-native species, many of which pose a great threat to aquatic ecosystems.

Species:

- Diaphanosoma amurensis Korovchinsky & Sheveleva, 2009
- Diaphanosoma australiensis Korovchinsky, 1981
- Diaphanosoma fluviatile Hansen, 1899
