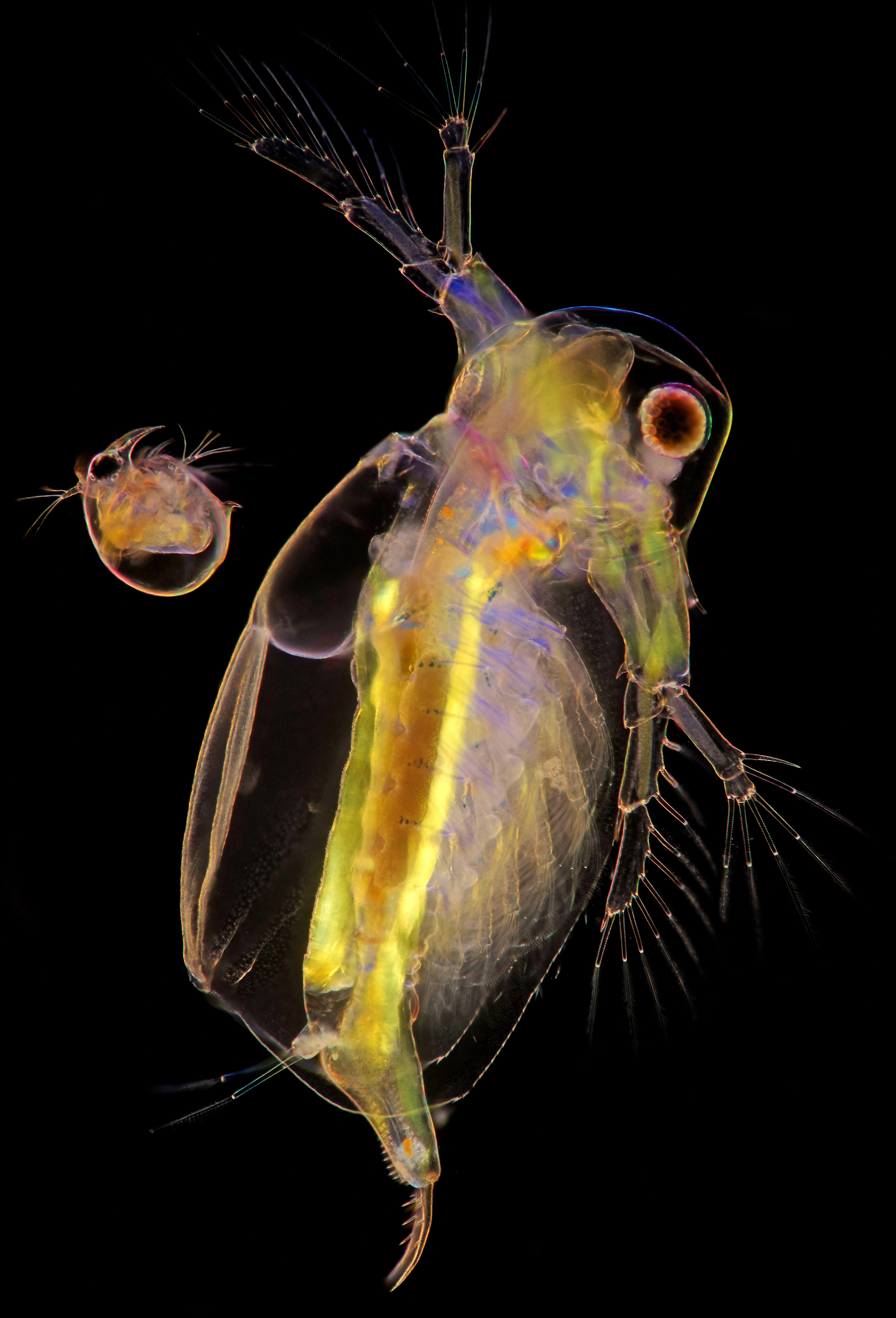

Scientific classification
- Domain: Eukaryota
- Kingdom: Animalia
- Phylum: Arthropoda
- Class: Branchiopoda
- Order: Ctenopoda
- Family: Sididae
- Genus: Sida
- Species: S. crystallina

Binomial name
- Sida crystallina (O. F. Müller, 1776)

= Sida crystallina =

Species of small freshwater animal

Sida crystallina is a species of ctenopod in the family Sididae. It is found in Europe.

== Subspecies ==
These two subspecies belong to the species Sida crystallina:

- Sida crystallina americana Korovchinsky, 1979
- Sida crystallina crystallina (O. F. Müller, 1776)
