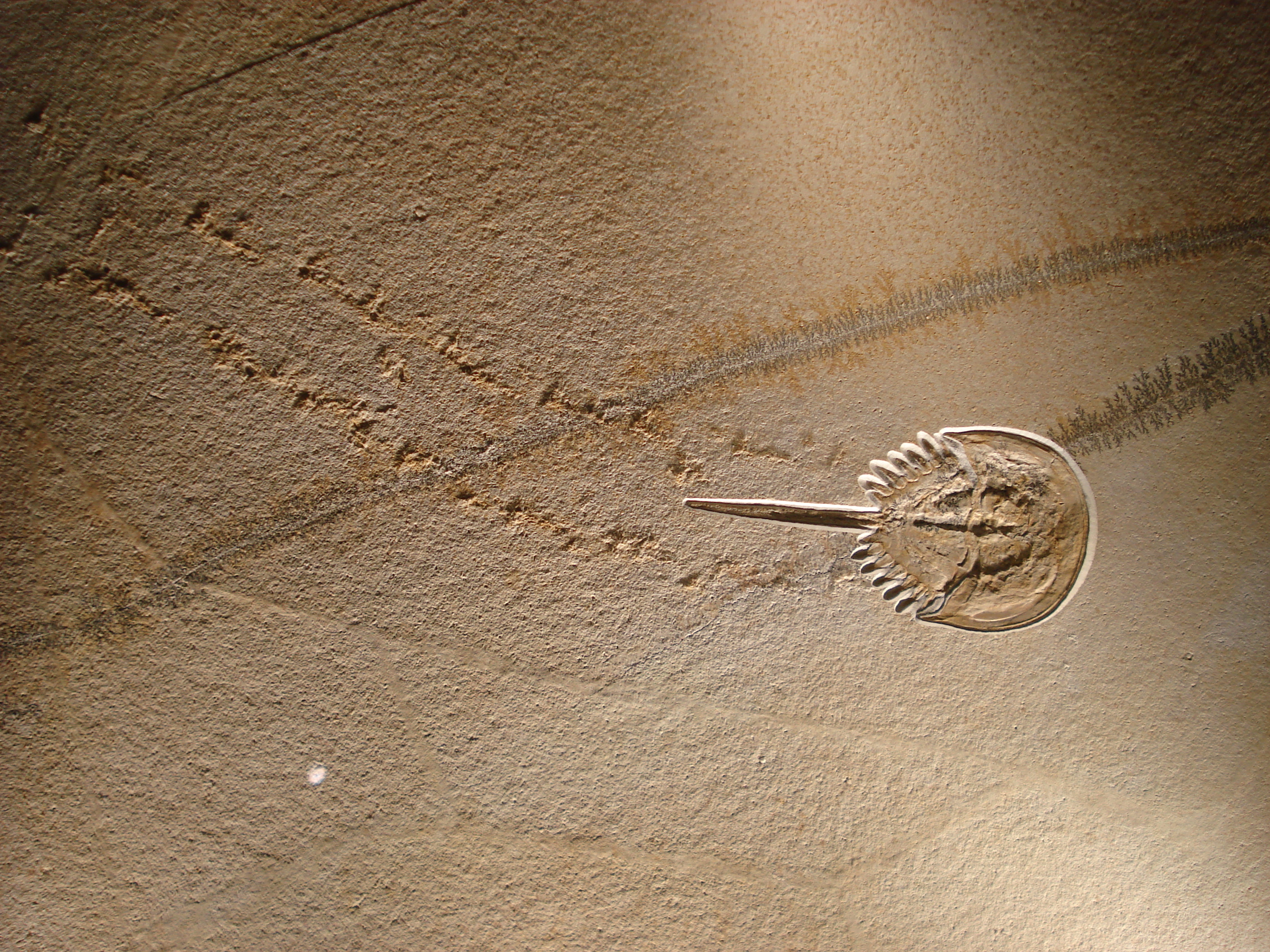
- Mesolimulus walchi with trackway

Trace fossil classification
- Domain: Eukaryota
- Kingdom: Animalia
- Phylum: Arthropoda
- Subphylum: Chelicerata
- Order: Xiphosura
- Ichnogenus: †Kouphichnium; Nopcsa, 1923

Synonyms
- Protornis Jaekel, 1929 (preocc.)

= Kouphichnium =

Kouphichnium Temporal range: 318.1–66.043 Ma

Trace fossil

Kouphichnium is an ichnogenus that has been attributed to limulids (horseshoe crabs). Kouphichnium fossils resemble the footprints of birds, sometimes in conjunction with a medial line, and were initially thought to be bird or pterosaur tracks. The footprints are now believed to be the imprints of specialized limulid appendages, called pushers, terminating in four plates, used to push against the sediment. The medial line is left by the animal's telson. This ichnogenus is registered in the Carboniferous to the Cretaceous, in marine marginal environments in Tennessee, the United States and in Poland, as well as non-marine environments of Argentina and England, among others. The genus contains five species, K. arizonae, K. cordifomnis, K. lithographicum, K. minusculum and K. walchi.

== See also ==
- List of xiphosuran genera
- Timeline of pterosaur research
- Trace fossil
- Mortichnia
