= Anoxic waters =

Areas of seawater, freshwater, or groundwater that are depleted of dissolved oxygen

Anoxic waters are bodies or areas of sea water, fresh water or groundwater that are depleted of dissolved oxygen. Anoxic waters can be contrasted with hypoxic waters, which are low but not completely lacking in dissolved oxygen, often defined as having oxygen concentration less than 2 milligrams per litre. This condition is generally found in areas that have water stagnation and/or dead stratification. The United States Geological Survey defines anoxic groundwater as that with a dissolved oxygen concentration of less than 0.5 milligrams per litre.

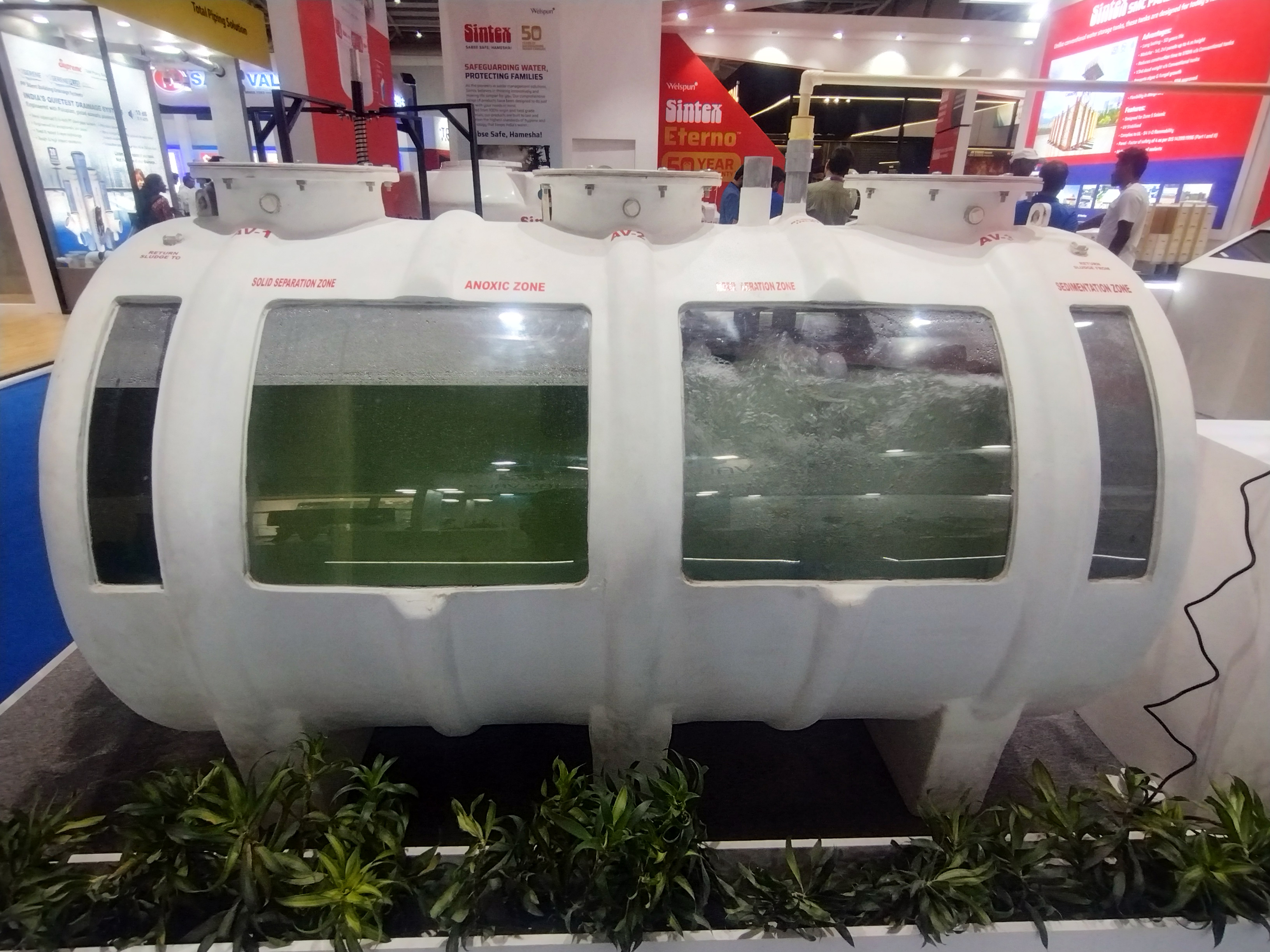
Demo of water purification involving different zones like: solid separation, anoxic and sedimentation, at Plumbex India 2026, BIEC

In most cases, oxygen diffusion is prevented from the shallower photic zone to deeper levels by a physical barrier, as well as by pronounced stratifications due to temperature or salinity, in which, for instance, denser, colder or hypersaline waters rest at the bottom of a basin. Anoxic conditions will occur if the rate of oxidative decomposition (aerobic digestion) of organic detritus by aerobic microorganisms (mainly fungi and aerobic bacteria) is greater than fresh supply of dissolved oxygen.

Anoxic waters are a natural phenomenon and have occurred throughout Earth's geological history. The Permian–Triassic extinction event, a mass extinction that wiped out most species from the world's oceans, may have resulted from widespread anoxic conditions combined with ocean acidification driven by a massive release of volcanic carbon dioxide into Earth's atmosphere by the supereruption of Siberian Traps, which concurrently also devastated the terrestrial vegetations responsible for photosynthetically removing carbon from the atmosphere. Many lakes have a permanent or temporary anoxic layer created by biotic aerobic respiration depleting oxygen at depth and thermal stratification preventing its replenishment to the depth.

Anoxic basins exist in the Baltic Sea, the Black Sea, the Cariaco Trench, various fjord valleys, and elsewhere. Eutrophication has likely increased the extent of anoxic zones in areas including the Baltic Sea, the Gulf of Mexico, and Hood Canal in Washington State.

== Causes and effects ==
Anoxic conditions result from a combination of environmental conditions, including density stratification, inputs of organic material or other reducing agents, and physical barriers to water circulation. In fjords, shallow sills at the entrance may prevent circulation. In contrast, at continental boundaries, the circulation may be especially low while the organic material input from production at upper levels is exceptionally high. In wastewater treatment, the absence of oxygen alone is indicated anoxic while the term anaerobic is used to indicate the absence of any common electron acceptor such as nitrate, sulfate or oxygen.

When oxygen is depleted in a basin, bacteria first turn to the second-best electron acceptor, which in seawater is nitrate. Denitrification occurs, and the nitrate will be consumed relatively rapidly. After reducing some other minor elements, the bacteria will turn to reducing sulfate. This results in the byproduct of hydrogen sulfide (H_{2}S), a chemical toxic to most biota and responsible for the characteristic "rotten egg" smell and dark black sediment color:

2 CH_{2}O + SO^{2−}_{4} → 2 HCO^{−}_{3} + H_{2}S + chemical energy

These sulfides will mostly be oxidized to either sulfates (~90%) in more oxygen-rich water or precipitated and converted into pyrite (~10%), according to the following chemical equations:

1. H_{2}S ⇌ HS^{−} + H^{+}
  HS^{−} + 2 O_{2} → HSO^{−}_{4}
2. H_{2}S ⇌ HS^{−} + H^{+}
  Fe^{2+} + HS^{−} → FeS + H^{+}
  FeS + H_{2}S → FeS_{2} + H_{2}

Some chemolithotrophs can also facilitate the oxidation of hydrogen sulfide into elemental sulfur, according to the following chemical equation:

H_{2}S + O_{2} → S + H_{2}O_{2}

Anoxia is quite common in muddy ocean bottoms where there are both high amounts of organic matter and low levels of inflow of oxygenated water through the sediment. Below a few centimetres from the surface, the interstitial water (pore water between sediment grains) is oxygen-free.

Anoxia is further influenced by biochemical oxygen demand (BOD), which represents the amount of oxygen utilised by marine organisms during the process of breaking down organic matter. BOD is influenced by the type of organisms present, the pH of the water, temperature, and the type of organic matter present in the area. BOD is directly related to the amount of dissolved oxygen available, especially in smaller bodies of water such as rivers and streams. As BOD increases, available oxygen decreases. This causes stress on larger organisms. BOD comes from natural and anthropogenic sources, including: dead organisms, manure, wastewater, and urban runoff.

== Human caused anoxic conditions ==
Eutrophication, a type of nutrient pollution (typically phosphates and nitrates) often as byproduct of agricultural runoff and sewage discharge, can result in large-scale but short-lived algal blooms. Although algae are photosynthetic autotrophs, the metabolic consumption of oxygen in rapidly proliferating algal populations within a relatively small area of water will quickly overwhelm any oxygen production, and decomposition of dead algal biomass that sink to the bottom further expends oxygen, creating expanding areas of hypoxia. When the local oxygen saturation drops too low to sustain the metabolic demands of other aquatic organisms, mass die-offs often occur, especially among more metabolically active nektonic aquatic animals such as fish. A notable example of such harmful algal blooms is the Gulf of Mexico, where a seasonal dead zone forms, which can be disrupted by weather patterns such as hurricanes and tropical convection. Sewage discharge, specifically that of nutrient-concentrated "sludge", can be especially damaging to ecosystem diversity. Large fish kills often happen to species sensitive to hypoxic conditions, who are replaced by fewer variety of hardier species, and these changes in ecological niches will spread up and down the food web, reducing the overall biodiversity of the affected aquatic ecosystem.

Gradual environmental changes through eutrophication or global warming can cause major oxic-anoxic regime shifts. Based on model studies, this can occur abruptly, with a transition between an oxic state dominated by chlorophyll-bearing cyanobacteria, and an anoxic state with anoxygenic, sulfate-reducing purple bacteria and archaea.

== Daily and seasonal cycles ==
The temperature of a body of water directly affects the amount of dissolved oxygen it can hold. Following Henry's law, as water becomes warmer, oxygen solubility decreases. This property leads to daily anoxic cycles on small geographic scales and seasonal cycles of anoxia on larger scales. Thus, bodies of water are more vulnerable to anoxic conditions during the warmest period of the day and during summer months. This problem can be further exacerbated in the vicinity of industrial discharge, where warm water used to cool machinery is less able to hold oxygen than the basin to which it is released.

The activity of photosynthetic organisms also influences daily cycles. The lack of photosynthesis during nighttime hours in the absence of light can result in anoxic conditions intensifying throughout the night, with a maximum shortly after sunrise.

== Biological adaptation ==
The reactions of individual species to eutrophication can vary widely. For example, some organisms, such as primary producers, can adapt quickly and even thrive under anoxic conditions. However, most organisms are highly susceptible to slight changes in aquatic oxygen levels. When a respiring organism is presented with little to no oxygen, the chances of survival decrease. Therefore, eutrophication and anoxic conditions in water lead to a reduction in biodiversity.

For example, the soft coral Xenia umbellata can resist some anoxic conditions for short periods. Still, after about three weeks, mean survival decreases to about 81%, and about 40% of surviving species experience size reductions, a lessening in coloration, and compromised pinnate structures. Another example of a susceptible organism is the Sydney cockle, Anadara trapezia. Enriched sediments have lethal and sublethal effects on this cockle, and, as stated in Vadillo Gonzalez et al. (2021), "movement of cockles was reduced in enriched sediments compared to natural treatments."

A study collecting over 850 published experiments "reporting oxygen thresholds and/or lethal times for a total of 206 species spanning the full taxonomic range of benthic metazoans."

Individual species will exhibit different adaptive responses to anoxic conditions, depending on their biological makeup and the condition of their habitat. While some can pump oxygen from higher water levels down into the sediment, other adaptations include specific haemoglobins for low-oxygen environments, slow movement to reduce the rate of metabolism, and symbiotic relationships with anaerobic bacteria. In all cases, the prevalence of excess nutrients results in low levels of biological activity and a lower level of species diversity, unless the area is ordinarily anoxic.

== Anoxic basins ==
- Bannock Basin in the Levantine Sea, Eastern Mediterranean;
- Black Sea Basin, off eastern Europe, below 50 metres (150 feet);
- Caspian Sea Basin, below 100 metres (300 feet);
- Cariaco Basin, off north central Venezuela;
- Gotland Deep, in the Baltic off Sweden;
- L'Atalante basin, eastern Mediterranean Sea
- Mariager Fjord, off Denmark;
- Orca Basin, northeast Gulf of Mexico;
- Saanich Inlet, off Vancouver Island, Canada;

== See also ==
- Anoxic event – Historic oxygen depletion events in Earth's oceans
- Dead zone (ecology) – Low-oxygen areas in coastal zones and lakes caused by eutrophication
- Hypoxia (environmental) – Low oxygen conditions or levels
- Meromictic – Permanently stratified lake with layers of water that do not intermix
- Mortichnia – Fossilised last steps of a living creature
- Ocean deoxygenation – Reduction of the oxygen content of the oceans
- Oxygen minimum zone – Zone in which oxygen saturation in seawater in the ocean is at its lowests
- Water stagnation – Water that does not flow
