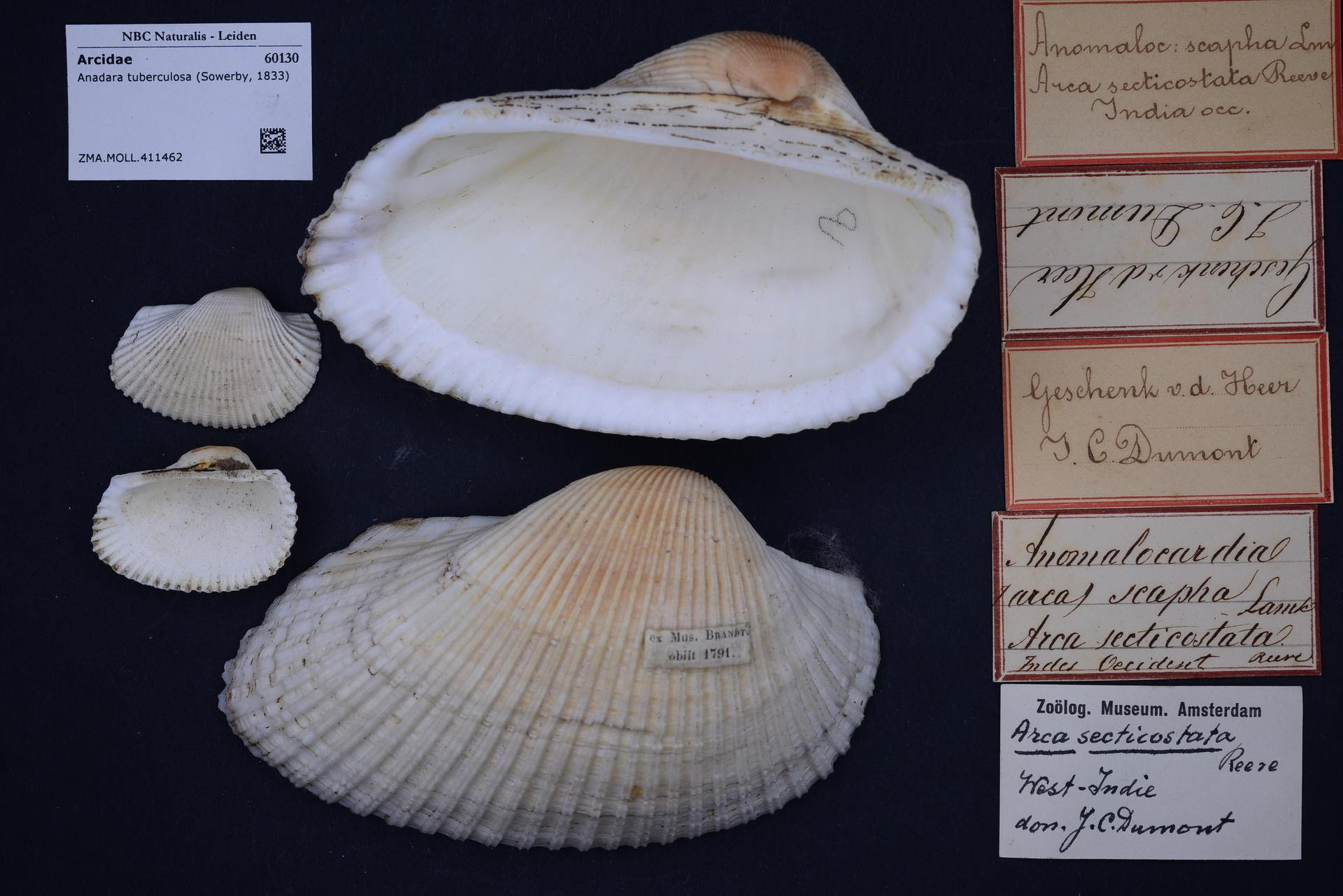

Scientific classification
- Domain: Eukaryota
- Kingdom: Animalia
- Phylum: Mollusca
- Class: Bivalvia
- Order: Arcida
- Family: Arcidae
- Genus: Anadara
- Species: A. tuberculosa

Binomial name
- Anadara tuberculosa (Sowerby I, 1833)

= Anadara tuberculosa =

Species of bivalve

Anadara tuberculosa is a species of bivalves belonging to the family Arcidae.

The species is found in the Americas, with its distribution ranging from Mexico to Peru. It lives in mangrove roots and has the common name mangrove cockle.
