= Anadara secernenda =

Scientific classification
- Kingdom: Animalia
- Phylum: Mollusca
- Class: Bivalvia
- Order: Arcida
- Family: Arcidae
- Genus: Anadara
- Species: A. secernenda

Binomial name
- Anadara secernenda (E. Lamy, 1907)

Synonyms
- Anadara baughmani (Philippi, 1851)

Species of bivalve

Anadara secernenda, also known as baughman ark or skewed arkis, is a saltwater clam in the family Arcidae, which includes the ark shells. This species is found in the Caribbean Sea and off the shores of Brazil. It was discovered in 1851.

== Description ==
Shells of Anadara secernenda are 1.5 inches (3.8 cm) in length.

== Distribution and habitat ==
Anadara secernenda is found offshore, to as deep as 91 metres (299 ft).
