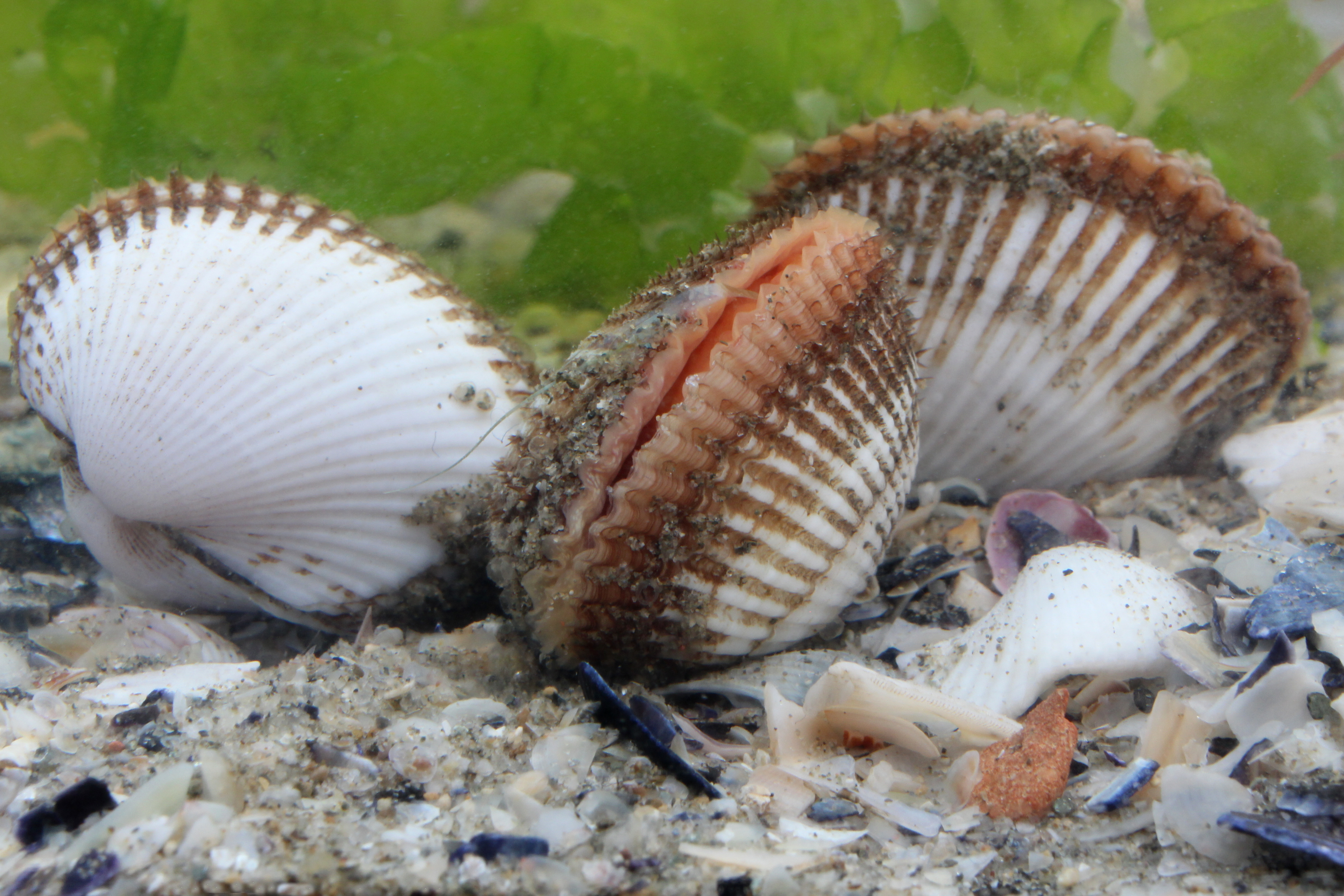

Scientific classification
- Kingdom: Animalia
- Phylum: Mollusca
- Class: Bivalvia
- Order: Arcida
- Family: Arcidae
- Genus: Anadara
- Species: A. kagoshimensis

Binomial name
- Anadara kagoshimensis Tokunaga, 1906

Synonyms
- List: Anadara sativa (F. R. Bernard, Cai & B. Morton, 1993); Arca (Scapharca) peitaihoensis Grabau & S. G. King, 1928; Arca amygdalum Philippi, 1845; Arca kagoshimensis Tokunaga, 1906; Arca subcrenata Lischke, 1869; Scapharca kagoshimensis (Tokunaga, 1906); Scapharca sativa F. R. Bernard, Cai & B. Morton, 1993; Scapharca subcrenata (Lischke, 1869)

= Anadara kagoshimensis =

Species of bivalve

Anadara kagoshimensis is an ark clam in the family Arcidae. It can be found in shallow water in temperate parts of the west Pacific Ocean and is cultivated in China, Japan, and Korea for human consumption. It is known as maohan in China and sarubōgai (or mogai) in Japan.

== Description ==
Anadara kagoshimensis has a white or cream coloured, thick, oval shell and superficially resembles a cockle. The left valve is slightly more concave than the right one, and there are 31 to 35 deeply indented ribs. The thin brown periostracum layer that covers the shell flakes off in strands. When harvested for human consumption, the length of Anadara kagoshimensis is usually in the range 30 to 45 millimetres (1.2 to 1.8 in).

== Distribution and habitat ==
Anadara kagoshimensis is found around the coasts of Japan and South Korea, buried in soft sediments in the subtidal zone. It favours mud or muddy sand. Some authorities maintain that the larvae, known as spats, need some hard materials such as stones and shells on which to attach themselves by their byssal threads. Other authorities claim that the larvae do not need hard substrates on which to settle. Anadara kagoshimensis is tolerant of low salinities and favours waters in the range 29–32 ppt. While the larvae are planktonic, they have a preference for even lower salinities of between 24.6 and 30 ppt and tend to congregate in estuarine waters with this degree of salinity. The clam thrives in waters varying in temperature between 5 °C and 28 °C. It also tolerates the low dissolved oxygen levels of tidal waters sweeping in over mud flats. It may be aided in this by the haemoglobin and erythrocytes found in its blood.

== Biology ==
Anadara kagoshimensis becomes mature at a length of about 15 mm (0.6 in). Individual clams are either male or female and spawning takes place between June and September. Fertilisation is external and the larvae form part of the zooplankton, drifting with the currents.

Anadara species do not have long siphons but normally lie in the sediment with their posterior end level with the surface or in a slight depression in the mud. The feeding habits of Anadara kagoshimensis have not been researched but are likely to be similar to those of the closely related Anadara granosa. That clam is thought to filter particles out of the water with its gills but also to feed on detritus and microorganisms in the sediment. This ability to live and feed in muddy substrates enables members of the genus Anadara to exploit a niche habitat that other bivalves tend to avoid. Predators that feed on Anadara kagoshimensis include the mallard, (Anas platyrhynchos), the tufted duck (Aythya fuligula), blue crabs (Portunus pelagicus), predatory snails and the common octopus. The newly settled larvae are preyed upon by the Japanese sea bass (Lateolabrax japonicus), eels and other fish as well as starfish, drills and blue crabs.

== Aquaculture ==
Anadara kagoshimensis is a fast-growing species, attaining a length of about 32 millimetres (1.3 in) in one year and 47 millimetres (1.9 in) in two. It is cultured in shallow areas of water in South Korea and in Japan. The main spat collection centre in Japan is a very shallow lagoon with a muddy bottom, Nakanoume, in Shimane Prefecture. Specially designed, long collecting devices are made of wire and palm fibre and the spat settles on these over an attachment period of 3 to 4 days. The collectors, each of which may have nearly 100,000 spats settled on it, are transported to nursery beds where they are laid on bamboo poles. Here the spats continue to grow, relatively free from seabed predators. The large number of spats that fall off during transport are seeded on the substrate at the rate of 15,000 to 30,000 per square metre. Predation and other causes of mortality reduce these to 5,500 to 6,000 per square metre in 6 months. When the juveniles have grown to about 10 mm (0.4 in) long they are moved to beds reserved for adults, from whence they are harvested a year later.

== Consumption ==
The clam, known as maohan (Chinese: 毛蚶) in Chinese, is considered a delicacy in China, especially the Shanghai region, where it is commonly eaten nearly raw after being boiled for a very short time. In 1988, an outbreak of hepatitis A in Shanghai was associated with the consumption of inadequately cooked Anadara kagoshimensis. 290,000 people were affected and there were 9 deaths. The Shanghai municipal government banned the sale of the clams after the outbreak.
