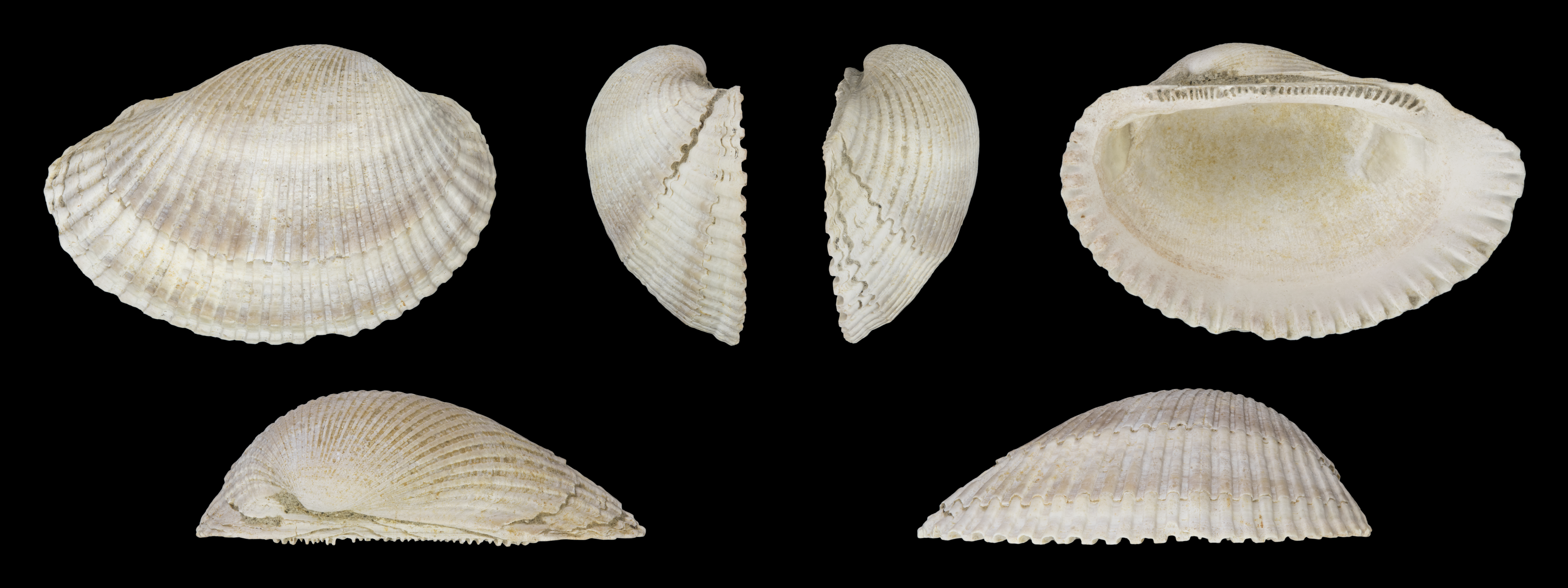
- Right (top) and left (down) valve of Anadara diluvii, Badenian of Austria
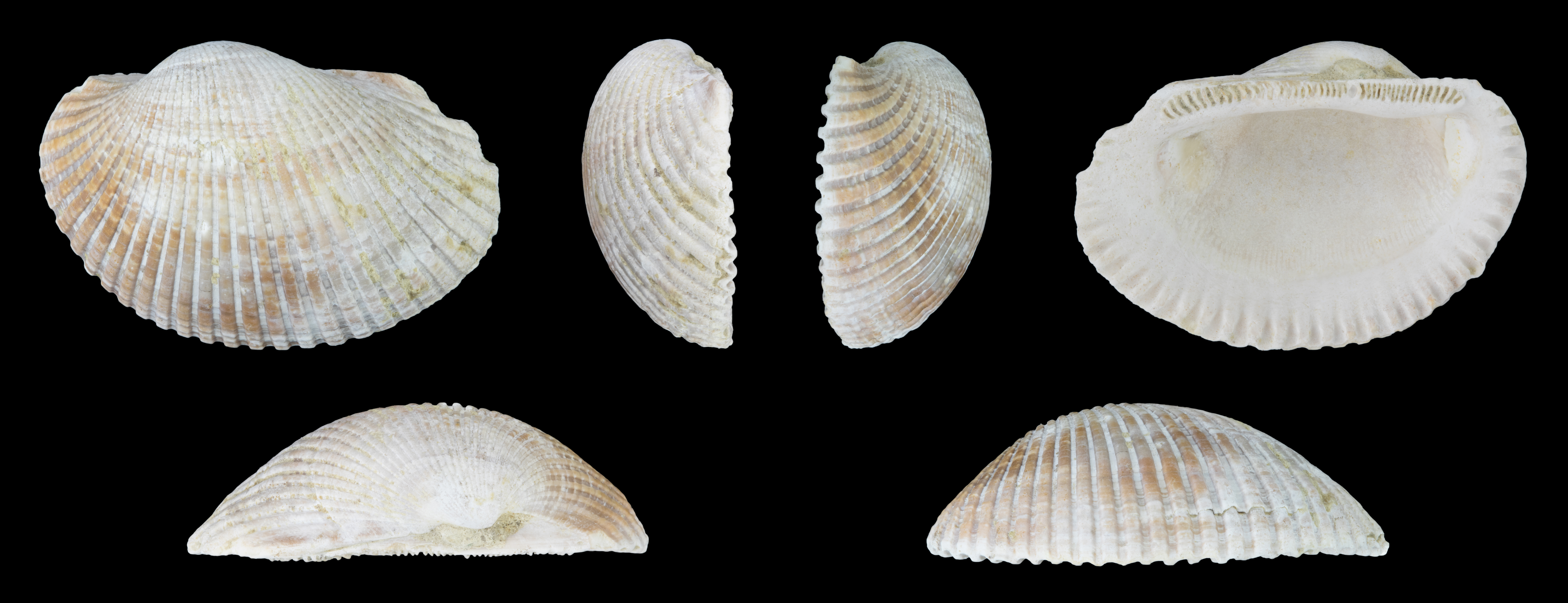

Scientific classification
- Kingdom: Animalia
- Phylum: Mollusca
- Class: Bivalvia
- Order: Arcida
- Family: Arcidae
- Genus: Anadara
- Species: A. diluvii

Binomial name
- Anadara diluvii † (Lamarck, 1805)

Synonyms
- Arca diluvii Lamarck, 1805 †

= Anadara diluvii =

Anadara diluvii Temporal range: Oligocene - Holocene

Extinct species of bivalve

Anadara diluvii is an extinct species of saltwater bivalves, ark clams, in the family Arcidae.

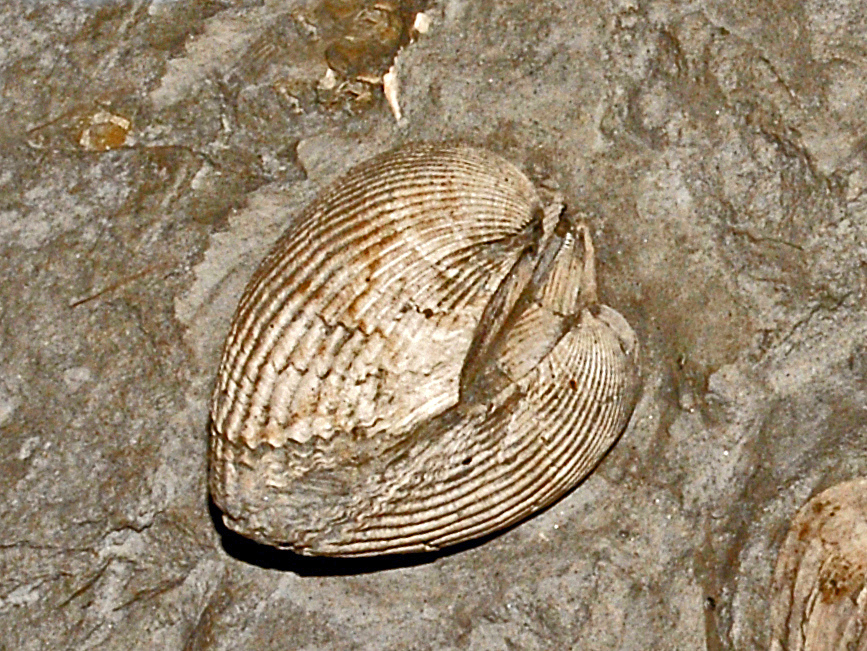
Fossil shell

== Description ==
Shells of Anadara diluvii can reach a size of 10–45 millimetres (0.39–1.77 in). The two valves are symmetrical to each other, but the sides are asymmetrical. The shell have about 30-35 ribs. The inner edge is strongly serrated.

== Fossil records ==
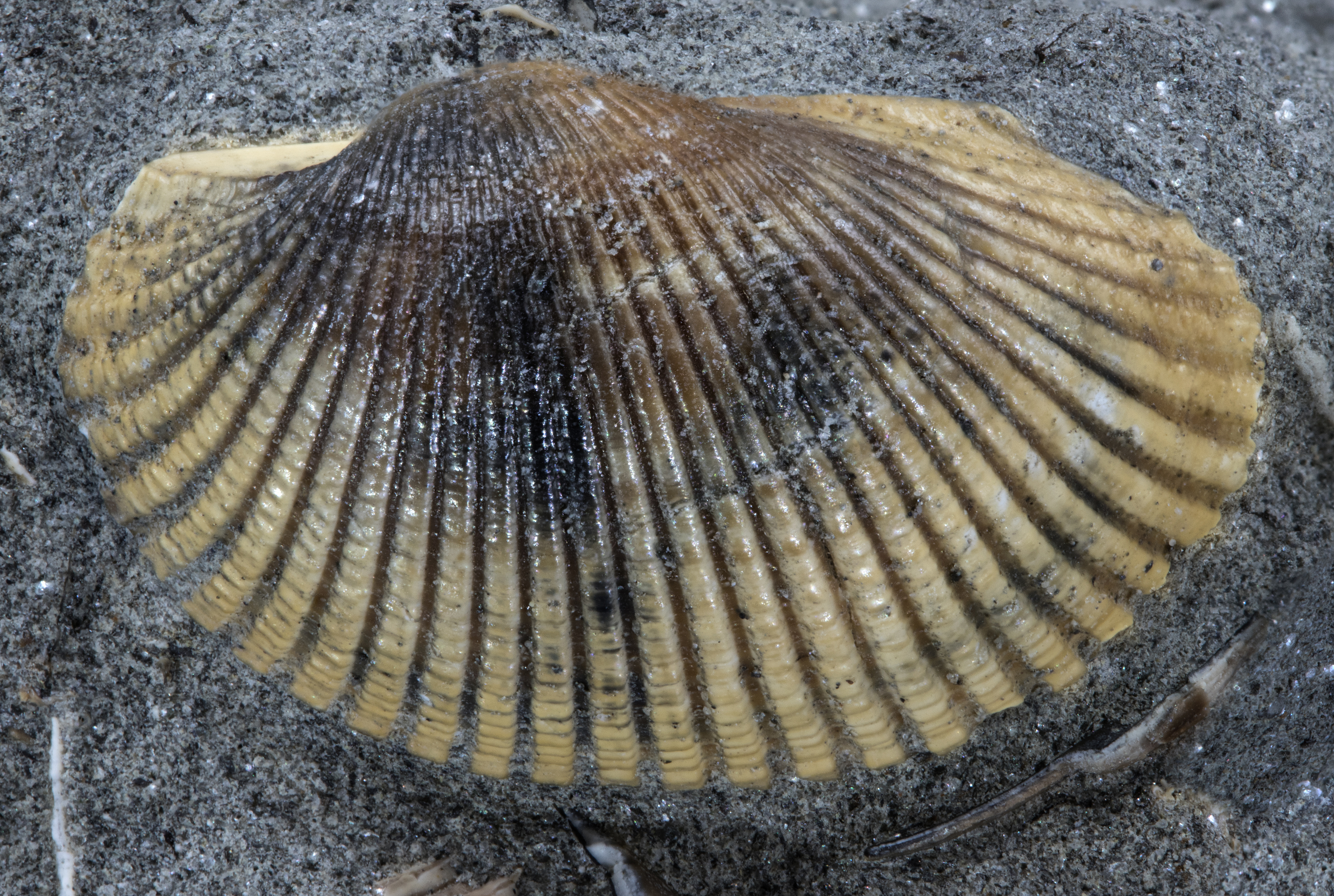
Lower Tortonian, Austria

This species is known in the fossil record from the Oligocene period to the Quaternary period (age range: 23.03 to 0.012 million years ago).

== Distribution ==
Fossils have been found in the Quaternary of Spain. In the Pliocene of Algeria, Cyprus, Greece, Italy, Spain, in the Miocene of Belgium, Bulgaria, Cyprus, Germany, Greece, Italy, Poland, Romania, Slovakia, Spain and in the Oligocene of Austria and Hungary.

== Bibliography ==
- Lamarck, J.B.P.A. de. (1805). Suite des mémoires sur les fossiles des environs de Paris. Annales du Muséum National d'Histoire Naturelle. 6: 214-221. Paris., available online at Biodiversity Heritage Library - page(s): 219
- Zamouri-Langar, N.; Chouba, L.; Ajjabi Chebil, L.; Mrabet, R.; El Abed, A. (2011). Les coquillages bivalves des côtes tunisiennes. Institut National des Sciences et Technologies de la Mer: Salammbô. ISBN 978-9938-9512-0-2. 128 pp.
- Powell A W B, New Zealand Mollusca, William Collins Publishers Ltd, Auckland, New Zealand 1979 ISBN 0-00-216906-1
- Antoni Hoffman Growth allometry in a bivalve Anadara diluvii (Lamarck) from the Badenian (Miocene) Korytnica Clays, Poland Acta Palaeontologica Polonica 23 (1), 1978: 41-49
