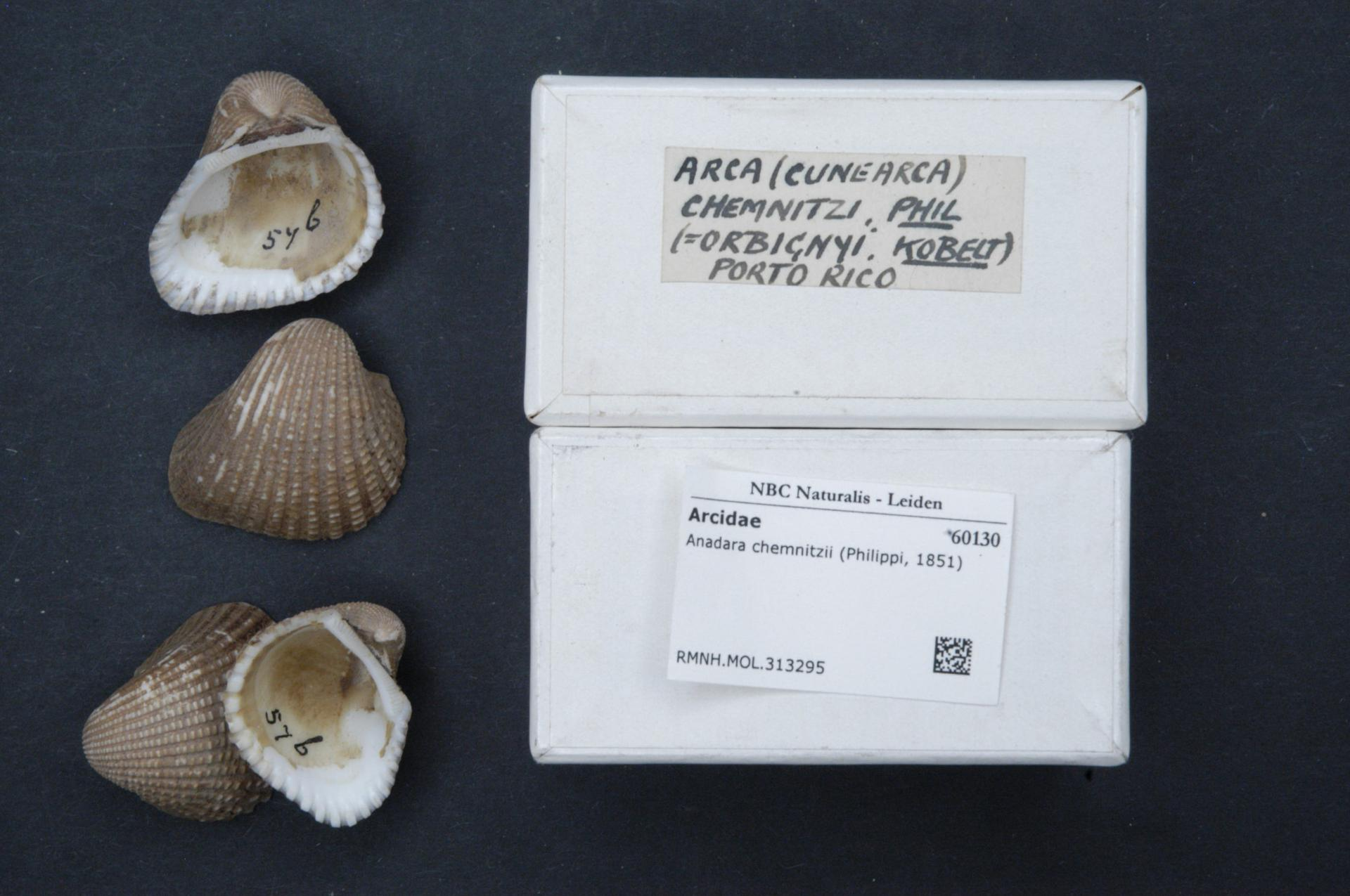

Scientific classification
- Kingdom: Animalia
- Phylum: Mollusca
- Class: Bivalvia
- Order: Arcida
- Family: Arcidae
- Genus: Anadara
- Species: A. chemnitzii

Binomial name
- Anadara chemnitzii (Philippi, 1851)

= Anadara chemnitzii =

Species of bivalve

Anadara chemnitzii, common name Chemnitz's ark clam, is a saltwater clam in the family Arcidae, the ark shells. This species is found in the Caribbean Sea, from Texas to the West Indies and Brazil.
