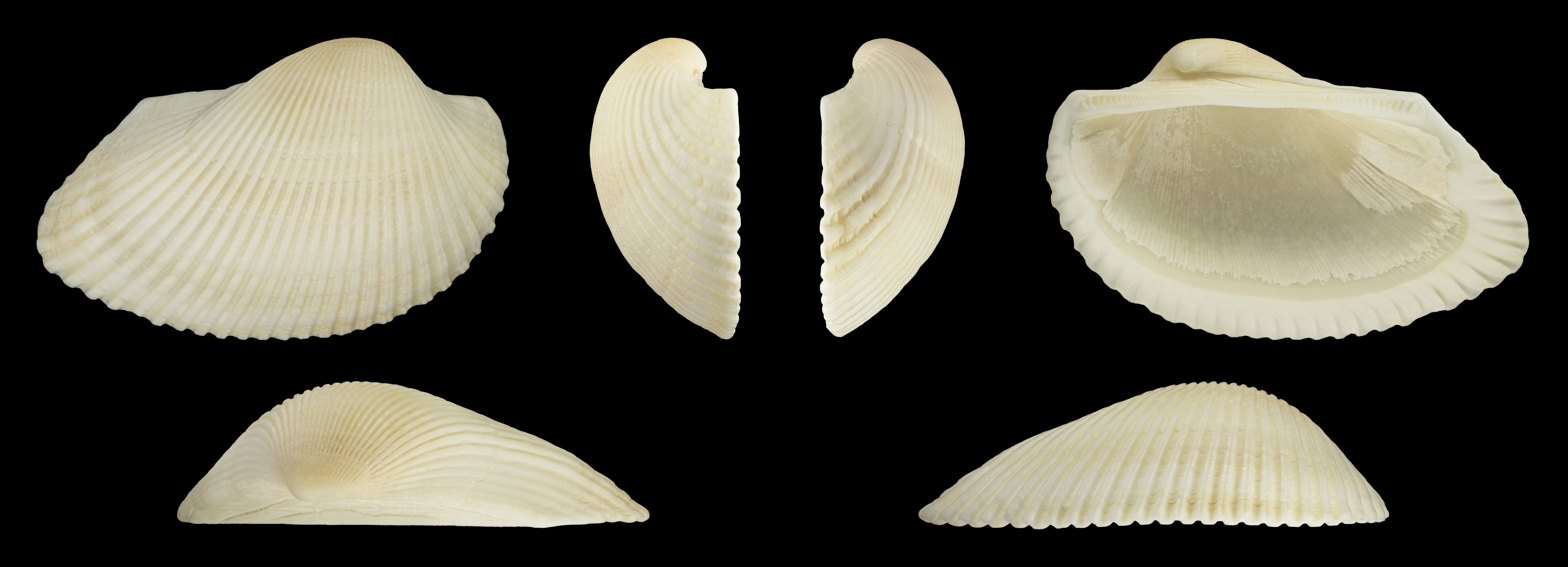

Scientific classification
- Kingdom: Animalia
- Phylum: Mollusca
- Class: Bivalvia
- Order: Arcida
- Family: Arcidae
- Genus: Anadara
- Species: A. secticostata

Binomial name
- Anadara secticostata (Reeve, 1844)

Synonyms
- Anadara floridana (Conrad, 1869)

= Anadara secticostata =

Species of bivalve

Anadara secticostata, also known as the cut-ribbed ark clam, is a white colored saltwater clam in the family Arcidae. It can be found along North American coast of the Atlantic Ocean, ranging from North Carolina to Texas, including the West Indies. Its shell grows up to 100mm, and the periostracum is dark brown. Its shape is slightly inequivalve, oblong and large. It consists of 30–38 curved radial ribs which increase in width towards the edges. These ribs are faintly incised, the groove is longitudinal.
