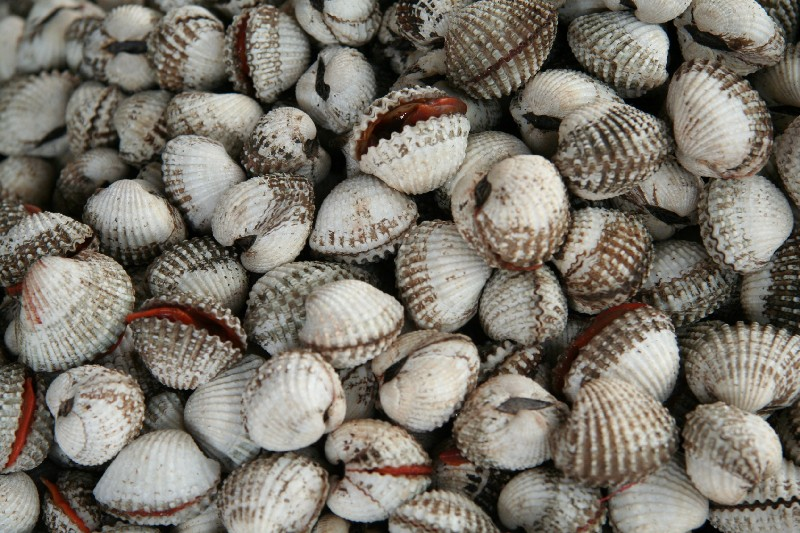
- Numerous live individuals of Anadara granosa on sale as seafood
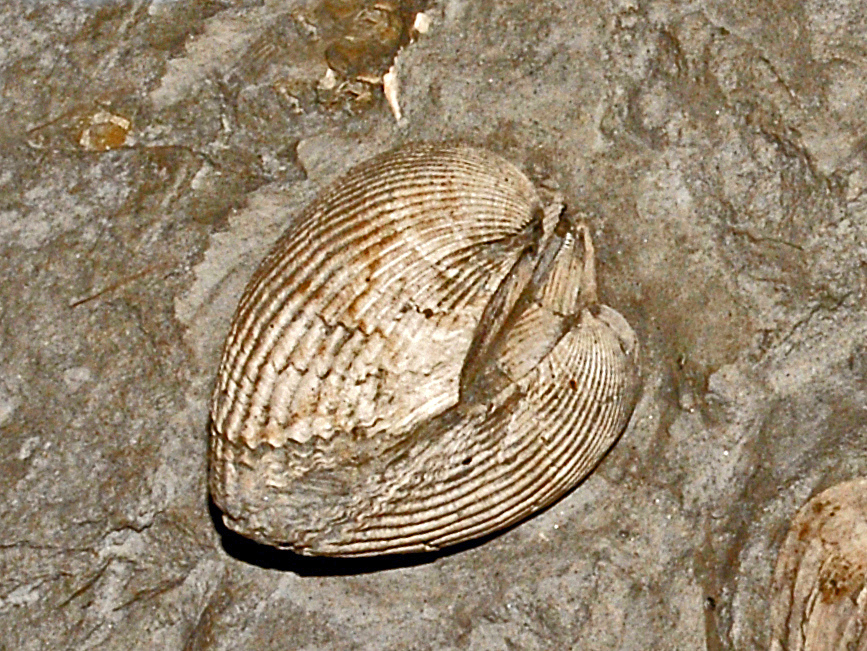
- Fossil of Anadara diluvii

Scientific classification
- Kingdom: Animalia
- Phylum: Mollusca
- Class: Bivalvia
- Order: Arcida
- Family: Arcidae
- Genus: Anadara; Gray, 1847

Species
- See text

Synonyms
- List: Anadara (Anadara) Gray, 1847; Anadara (Cunearca) Dall, 1898; Anadara (Diluvarca) Woodring, 1925; Anadara (Scapharca) Gray, 1847; Anadara (Tosarca) H. Noda, 1965; Arca (Scapharca) Gray, 1847; Caloosarca Olsson, 1961; Cara Gray, 1857; Cunearca Dall, 1898; Diluvarca Woodring, 1925; Esmerarca Olsson, 1961; Imparilarca Iredale, 1929; Kikaiarca H. Noda, 1966 †; Potiarca Iredale, 1939; Rasia Gray, 1857; Scapharca Gray, 1847; Scapharca (Cunearca) Dall, 1898; Scapharcopsis F. Nordsieck, 1969; Sectiarca Olsson, 1961; Tosarca H. Noda, 1965 †

= Anadara =

Anadara Temporal range: Cretaceous - Recent

Genus of bivalves

Anadara is a genus of saltwater bivalves, ark clams, in the family Arcidae. It is also called Scapharca.

This genus is known in the fossil record from the Cretaceous period to the Quaternary period (age range: 140.2 to 0.0 million years ago). These fossils have been found all over the world.

== Species ==
The following species are recognised in the genus Anadara:

- Anadara adamsi Olsson, 1961
- Anadara aequatorialis (d'Orbigny, 1846)
- Anadara aethiopica (Thiele, 1931)
- Anadara aliena (Iredale, 1939)
- Anadara ambigua (Reeve, 1844)
- Anadara amicula (Yokoyama, 1925) †
- Anadara angicostata (Reeve, 1844)
- Anadara antiquata (Linnaeus, 1758)
- Anadara auriculata Lamarck
- Anadara axelolssoni (Macsotay & Campos, 2001)
- Anadara bataviensis (E. Lamy, 1907)
- Anadara biangulata (G. B. Sowerby I, 1833)
- Anadara bifrons (P. P. Carpenter, 1857)
- Anadara bonplandiana (A. d'Orbigny, 1843) †
- Anadara brasiliana (Lamarck, 1819) - incongruous ark
- Anadara broughtonii (Schrenck, 1867)
- Anadara camerunensis P. G. Oliver & Cosel, 1993
- Anadara cepoides (Reeve, 1844)
- Anadara chemnitzii (Philippi, 1851) - Chemnitz ark, triangular ark
- Anadara cistula (Reeve, 1844)
- Anadara compacta (Reeve, 1844)
- Anadara concinna (Sowerby, 1833)
- Anadara consociata (E. A. Smith, 1885)
- Anadara corbuloides (Monterosato, 1881)
- Anadara cornea (Reeve, 1844)
- Anadara corrugata (E. Lamy, 1907)
- Anadara crassicostata (H. Adams, 1873)
- Anadara craticulata (Nyst, 1848)
- Anadara crebricostata (Reeve, 1844)
- Anadara cymbaeformis (Reeve, 1844)
- † Anadara diluvii (Lamarck, 1805)
- Anadara disparilis (Reeve, 1844)
- Anadara eborensis P. G. Oliver & Cosel, 1993
- Anadara ehrenbergi (Dunker, 1868)
- Anadara emarginata (G. B. Sowerby I, 1833)
- Anadara esmeralda (Pilsbry & Olsson, 1941)
- Anadara ferruginea (Reeve, 1844)
- Anadara formosa (G. B. Sowerby I, 1833)
- Anadara fultoni (G. B. Sowerby III, 1907)
- Anadara geissei (Kobelt, 1891)
- Anadara gibbosa (Reeve, 1844)
- Anadara globosa (Reeve, 1844)
- Anadara guangdongensis (F. R. Bernard, Cai & B. Morton, 1993)
- Anadara gubernaculum (Reeve, 1844)
- Anadara hankeyana (Reeve, 1844)
- Anadara hemidesmos (Philippi, 1845)
- Anadara hyphalopilema G. B. Campbell, 1962
- Anadara inaequivalvis (Bruguière, 1789)
- Anadara indica (Gmelin, 1791)
- Anadara jousseaumei (E. Lamy, 1907)
- Anadara jurata Iredale, 1939
- Anadara kagoshimensis (Tokunaga, 1906)
- Anadara kikaizimana (Nomura & Zinbo, 1934)
- Anadara labiosa (G. B. Sowerby I, 1833)
- Anadara lienosa (Say, 1832)
- Anadara lirata (Philippi, 1887) †
- Anadara livingstonei Iredale, 1927
- Anadara mazatlanica (Hertlein & A. M. Strong, 1943)
- Anadara muii Thach, 2016
- Anadara natalensis (Krauss, 1848)
- Anadara notabilis (Röding, 1798) - eared ark
- Anadara nugax Iredale, 1939
- Anadara nux (Sowerby, 1833)
- Anadara obesa (G. B. Sowerby I, 1833)
- Anadara occlusa (Reeve, 1844)
- Anadara oceanica (Lesson, 1831)
- Anadara passa Iredale, 1939
- Anadara perlabiata (U. S. Grant & Gale, 1931)
- Anadara pilula (Reeve, 1843)
- Anadara pumila (Dunker, 1868)
- Anadara pygmaea (H. Adams, 1872)
- Anadara reinharti (H. N. Lowe, 1935)
- Anadara rhomboidalis (Schumacher, 1817)
- Anadara rotundicostata (Reeve, 1844)
- Anadara rufescens (Reeve, 1844)
- Anadara rugifera (Dunker, 1866)
- Anadara sabinae (Morlet, 1889)
- Anadara satowi (Dunker, 1882)
- Anadara secernenda (E. Lamy, 1907) - Baughman ark, skewed ark
- Anadara secticostata Reeve, 1844
- Anadara senegalensis (Gmelin, 1791)
- Anadara setigericosta (Nyst, 1848)
- Anadara similis - ark cockle or mangrove cockle
- Anadara speciosa (Philippi, 1849)
- Anadara subglobosa (Kobelt, 1889)
- Anadara subgranosa (Dunker, 1869)
- Anadara subrubra (Dunker, 1866)
- Anadara tosaensis H. Noda, 1965 †
- Anadara transversa (Say, 1822) - transverse ark
- Anadara trapezia (Deshayes, 1839)
- Anadara tricenicosta (Nyst, 1848)
- Anadara troscheli (Dunker, 1882)
- Anadara tuberculosa (G. B. Sowerby I, 1833) - pustulose ark
- Anadara uropigimelana (Bory de Saint-Vincent, 1827)
- Anadara valentichscotti Thach, 2016
- Anadara vellicata (Reeve, 1844)

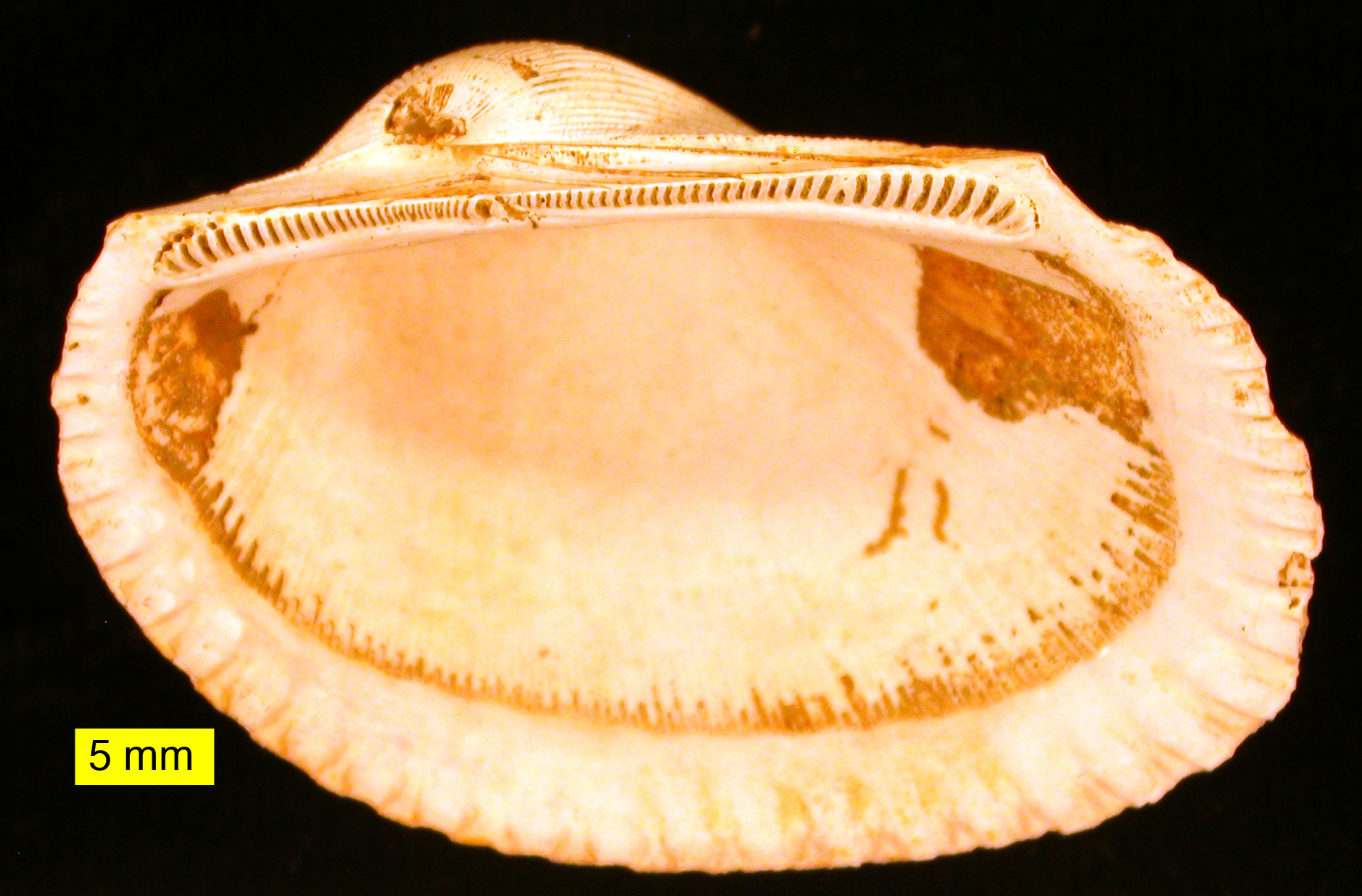
Anadara valve interior showing taxodont dentition; Pliocene of Cyprus.

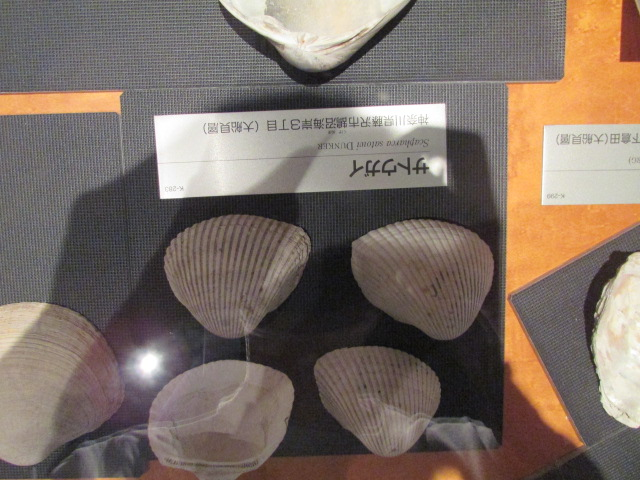
Fossils of Anadara satowi
