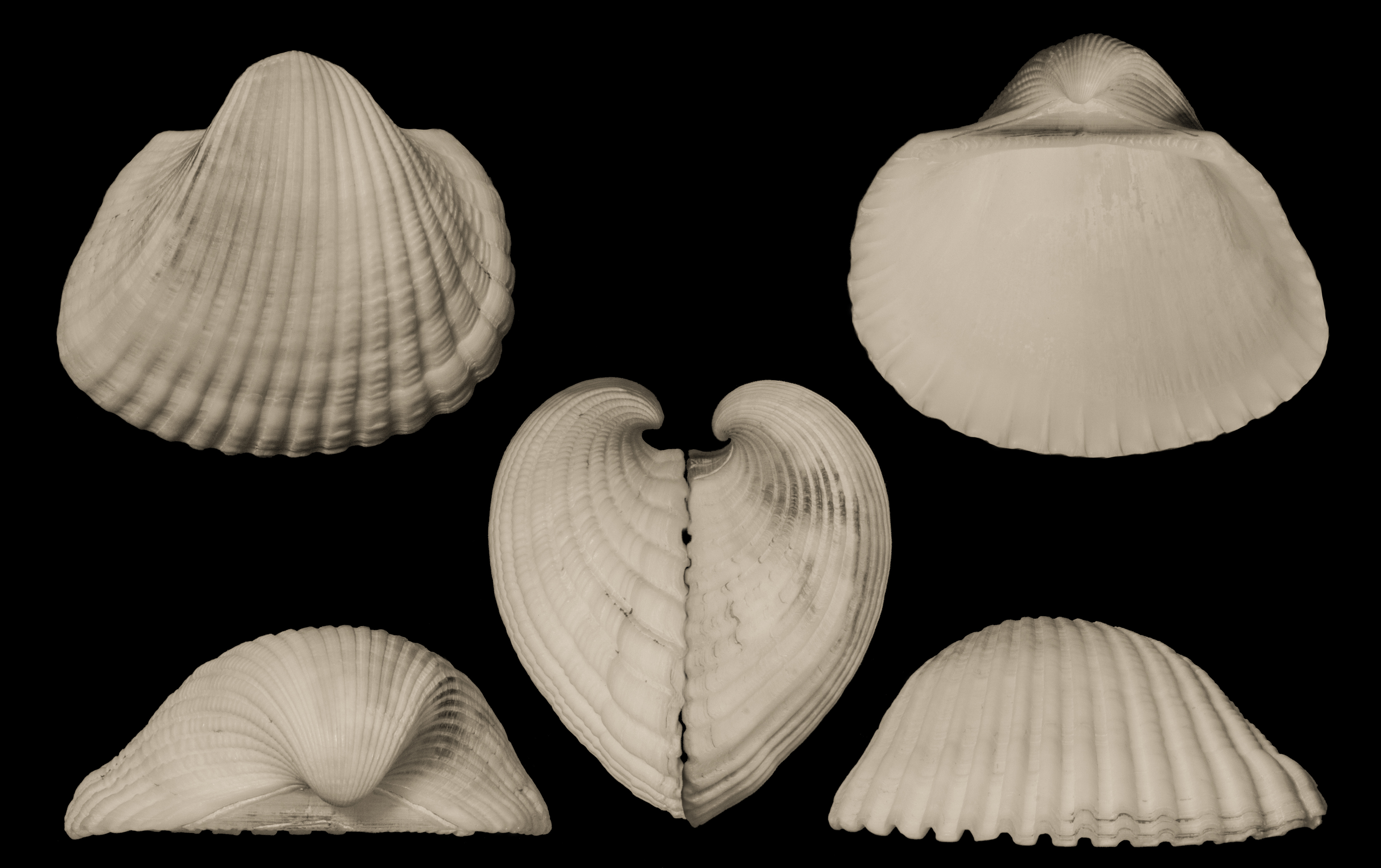

Scientific classification
- Kingdom: Animalia
- Phylum: Mollusca
- Class: Bivalvia
- Order: Arcida
- Family: Arcidae
- Genus: Anadara
- Species: A. brasiliana

Binomial name
- Anadara brasiliana (Lamarck, 1819)

= Anadara brasiliana =

Species of bivalve

Anadara brasiliana (common name: Incongruous Ark Clam) is a saltwater clam in the family Arcidae, the ark shells. This species is found along the Atlantic coast of North America, from North Carolina to Brazil.
