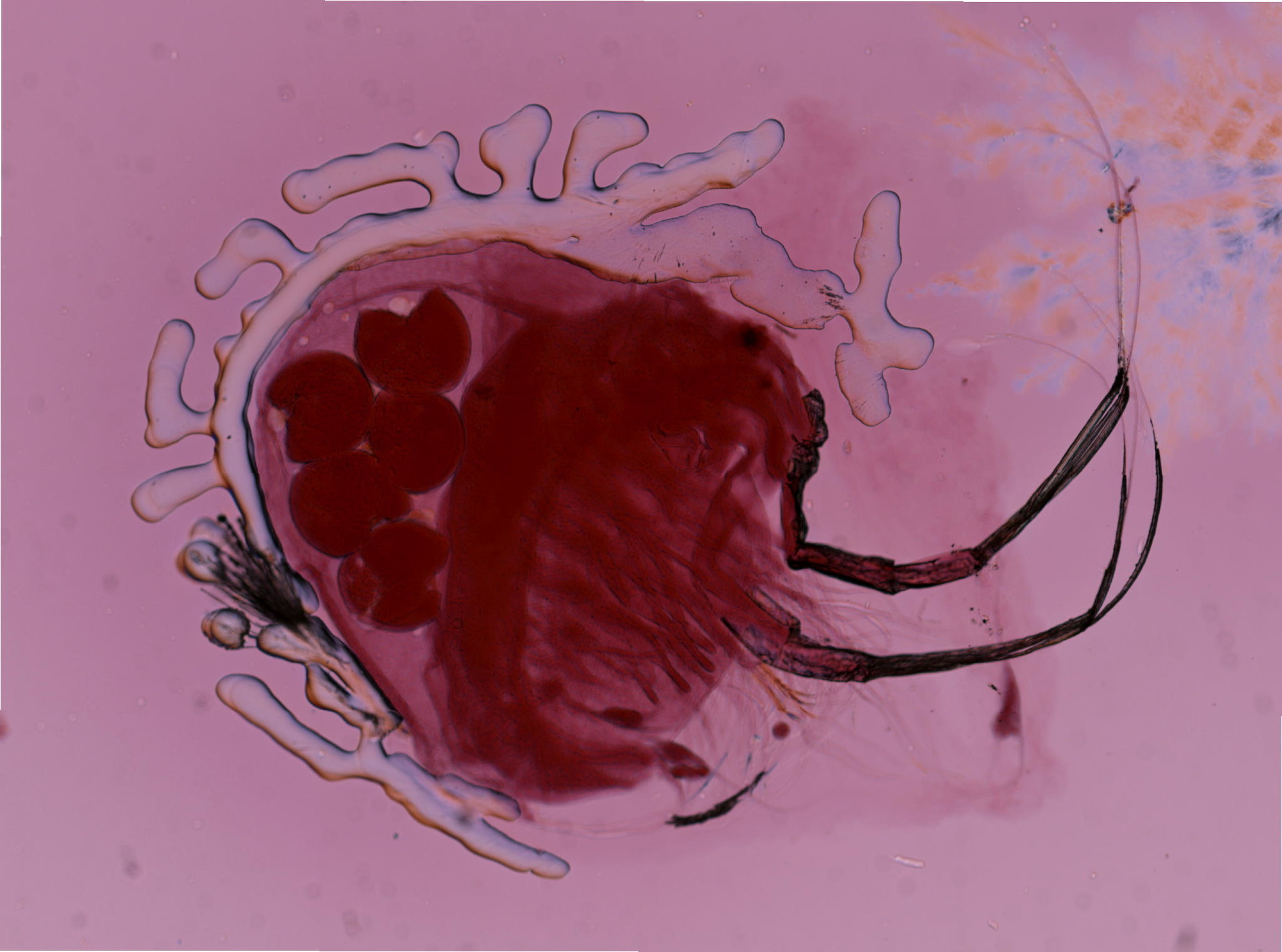
- Holopedium gibberum

Scientific classification
- Domain: Eukaryota
- Kingdom: Animalia
- Phylum: Arthropoda
- Class: Branchiopoda
- Order: Ctenopoda
- Family: Holopediidae; Sars, 1865
- Genus: Holopedium; Zaddach, 1855

= Holopedium =

Genus of small freshwater animals

Holopedium is the sole genus of water fleas in the family Holopediidae. There are about seven described species in Holopedium.

== Species ==
These seven species belong to the genus Holopedium:

- Holopedium acidophilum Rowe, Adamowicz & Hebert, 2007
- Holopedium amazonicum Stingelin, 1904
- Holopedium atlanticum Rowe, Adamowicz & Hebert, 2007
- Holopedium gibberum Zaddach, 1855
- Holopedium glacialis Rowe, Adamowicz & Hebert, 2007
- Holopedium groenlandicum Korovchinsky, 2005
- Holopedium ramasarmii Rao, Naidu & Padmaja, 1998
