= Mortichnia =

Fossilised last steps of a living creature

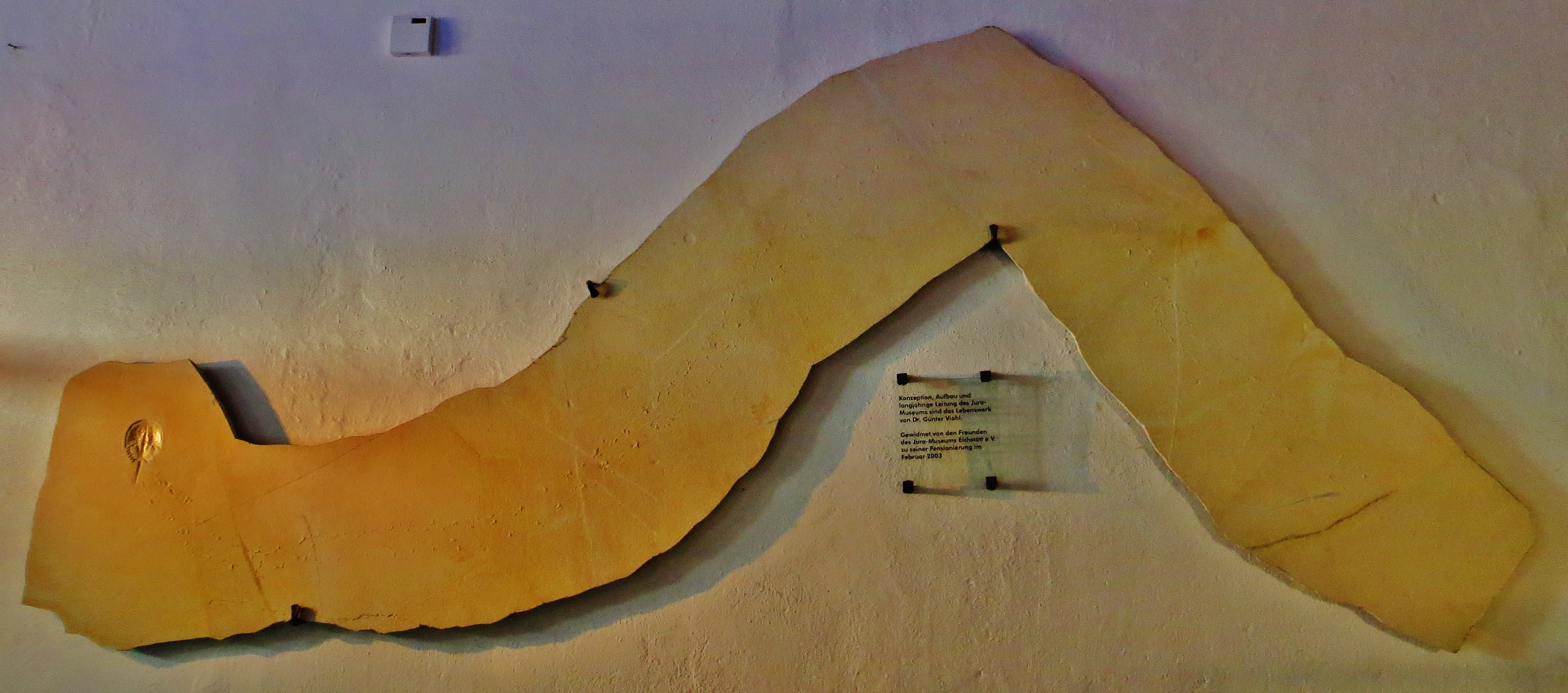
A mortichnia left by a Mesolimulus walchi (on the far left), Jura Museum, Eichstätt

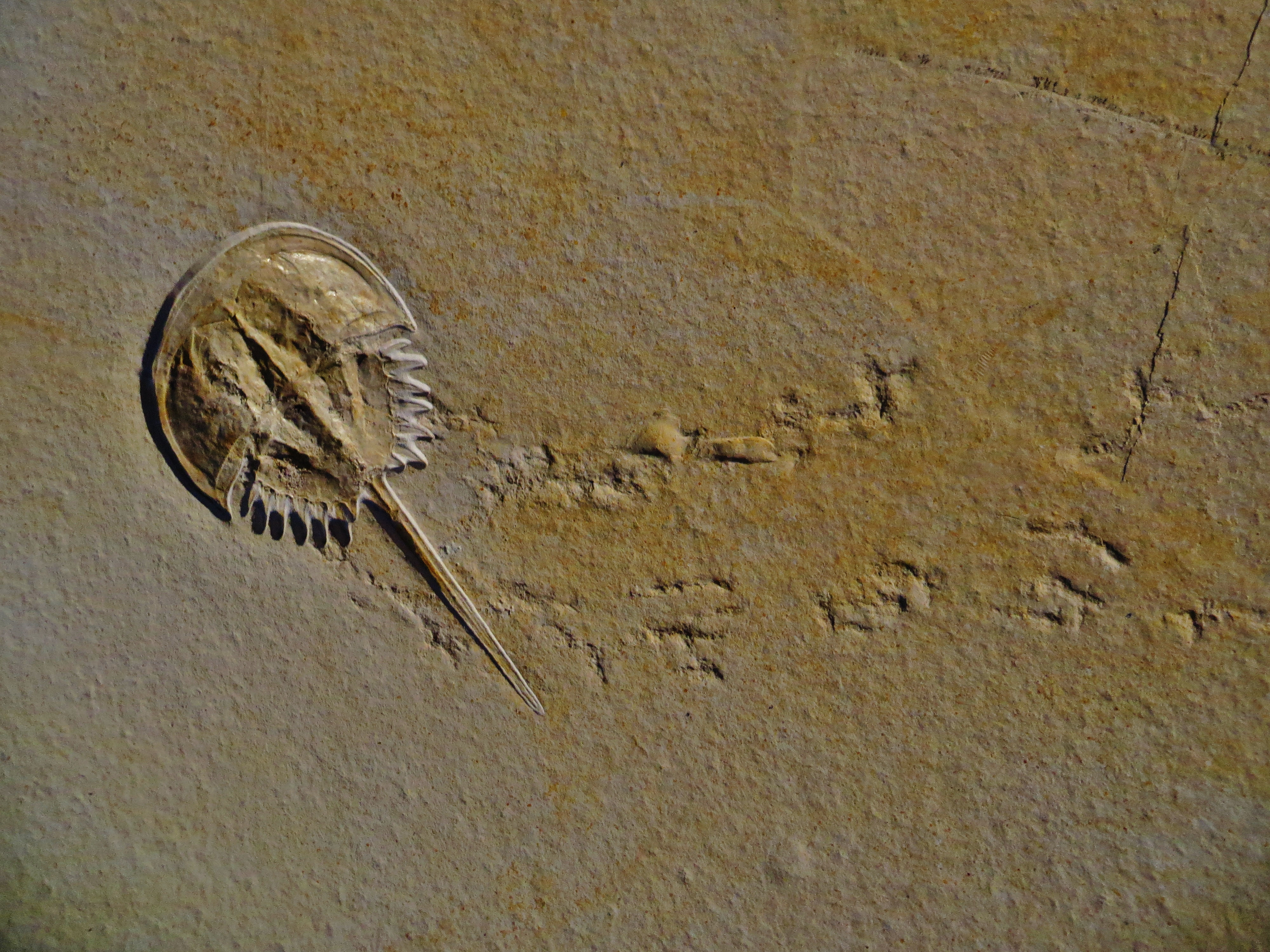
Closeup of the same Mesolimulus

A mortichnia is the "death march", or last walk, of a living creature. These are sometimes preserved as fossil footprints.

== Notable examples ==
In 2002 the mortichnia of a horseshoe crab was found in lithographic limestone in Bavaria, Germany. The trail measured 9.7m and was left about 150 million years ago when the crab died in an anoxic lagoon. The footprints left enough evidence for researchers to determine that the creature probably fell into the lagoon upside-down, righted itself, and started walking before succumbing to the anoxic conditions of the water. The trackway is currently exhibited at the Wyoming Dinosaur Center.

== See also ==
- Kouphichnium, an ichnogenus attributed to horseshoe crabs
