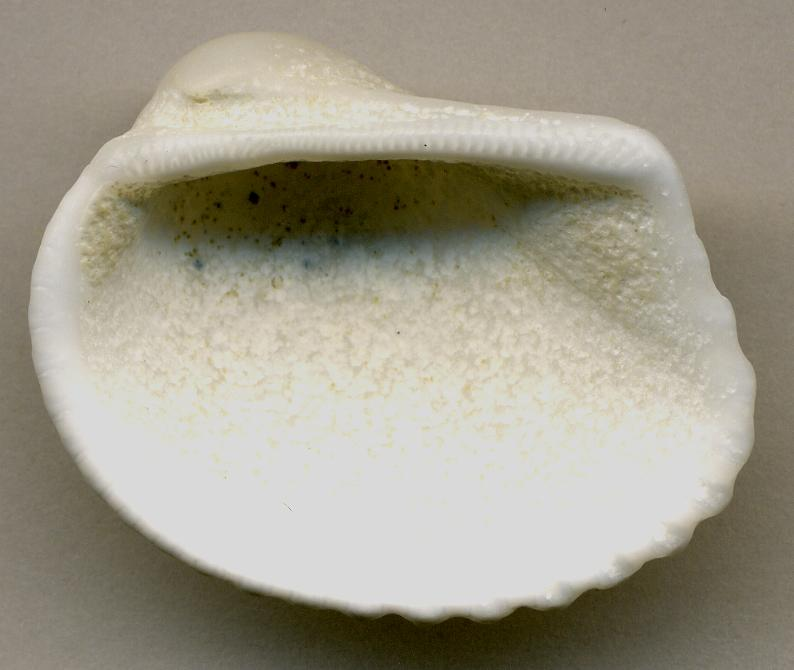

Conservation status
- Secure (NatureServe)

Scientific classification
- Kingdom: Animalia
- Phylum: Mollusca
- Class: Bivalvia
- Order: Arcida
- Family: Arcidae
- Genus: Anadara
- Species: A. notabilis

Binomial name
- Anadara notabilis (Röding, 1798)

= Anadara notabilis =

Species of bivalve

Anadara notabilis, or the Eared ark clam, is a clam in the family Arcidae. It can be found in Caribbean waters, ranging from Florida to Bermuda and Brazil.
