= Anadara trapezia =

Scientific classification
- Domain: Eukaryota
- Kingdom: Animalia
- Phylum: Mollusca
- Class: Bivalvia
- Order: Arcida
- Family: Arcidae
- Genus: Anadara
- Species: A. trapezia

Binomial name
- Anadara trapezia Deshayes, 1840

Species of bivalve

Anadara trapezia, the Sydney cockle (NSW), or ark cockle (Queensland), is an estuarine filter-feeding bivalve. Its calcareous, heavily ribbed shell can grow to approximately 7 to 8 cm (2.8 to 3.1 in) across. Its range is along the east coast of Australia, from Queensland to Victoria. It has previously existed in Western Australia, South Australia, and the coast of New Zealand during the Middle Holocene. It has been used as a bioindicator/indicator species to study levels of the metals selenium, copper and cadmium.
