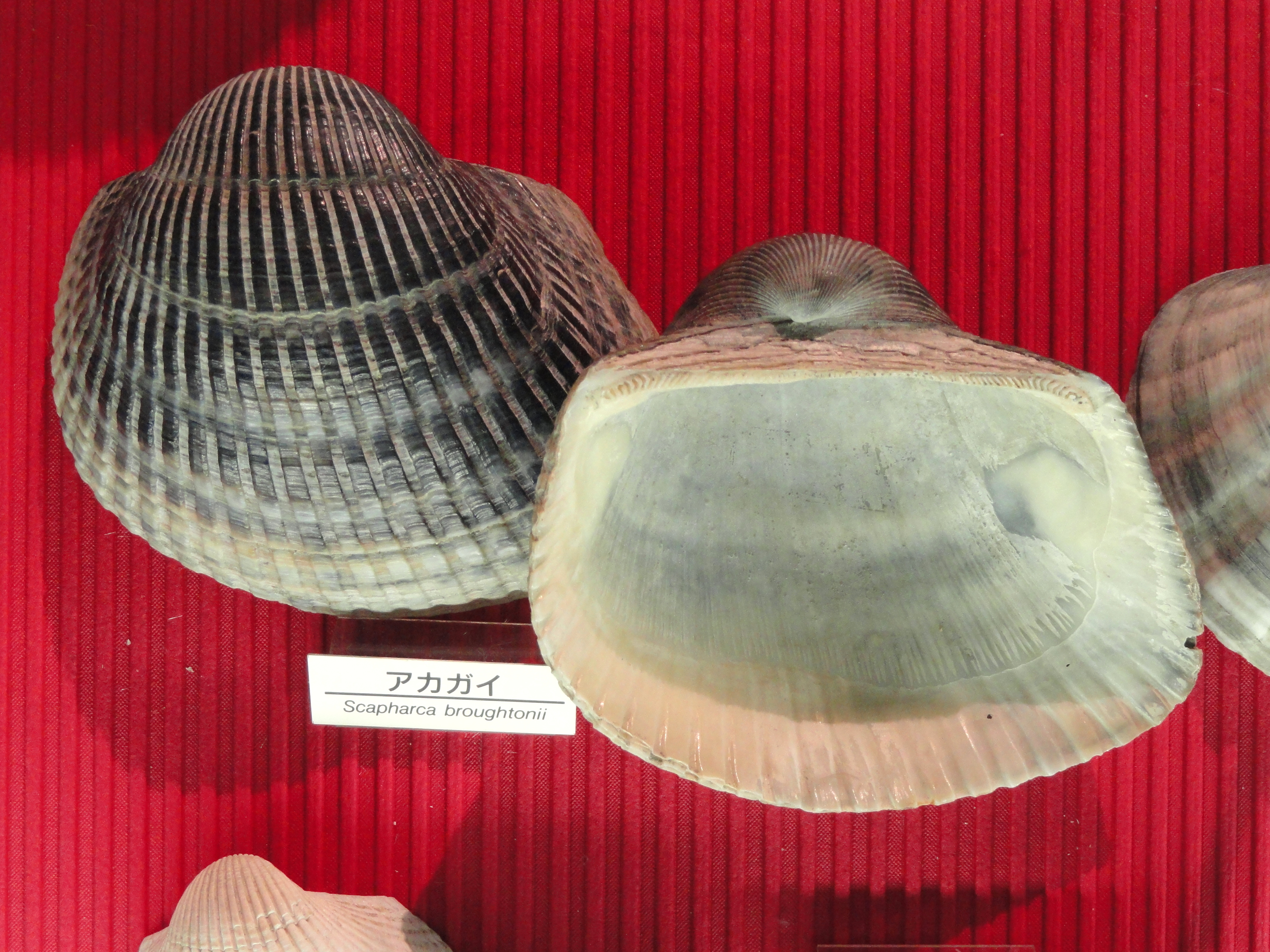

Scientific classification
- Kingdom: Animalia
- Phylum: Mollusca
- Class: Bivalvia
- Order: Arcida
- Family: Arcidae
- Genus: Anadara
- Species: A. broughtonii

Binomial name
- Anadara broughtonii (Schrenck, 1867)

= Anadara broughtonii =

Species of bivalve

Anadara broughtonii is a species of Ark clam. It is also known by its Japanese name, akagai. The species was described by Shrenck in 1867. Originally belonging to the genus Scapharca, the genus has merged with Anadara now.

Adult blood clams can reach a shell length of 100 mm and are commercially harvested in China, Japan, and Korea as a source of sashimi. To develop both the scientific research and improve the aquaculture of blood clams, a chromosomal-level genome assembly of the S. broughtonii genome has been sequenced and assembled, producing a 884.5-Mb genome.

== Distribution ==
The species is distributed in the Far East, from Russia down to Korea, Mainland China, Japan and Taiwan.

== As food ==
The clam is eaten in Japan as sushi.

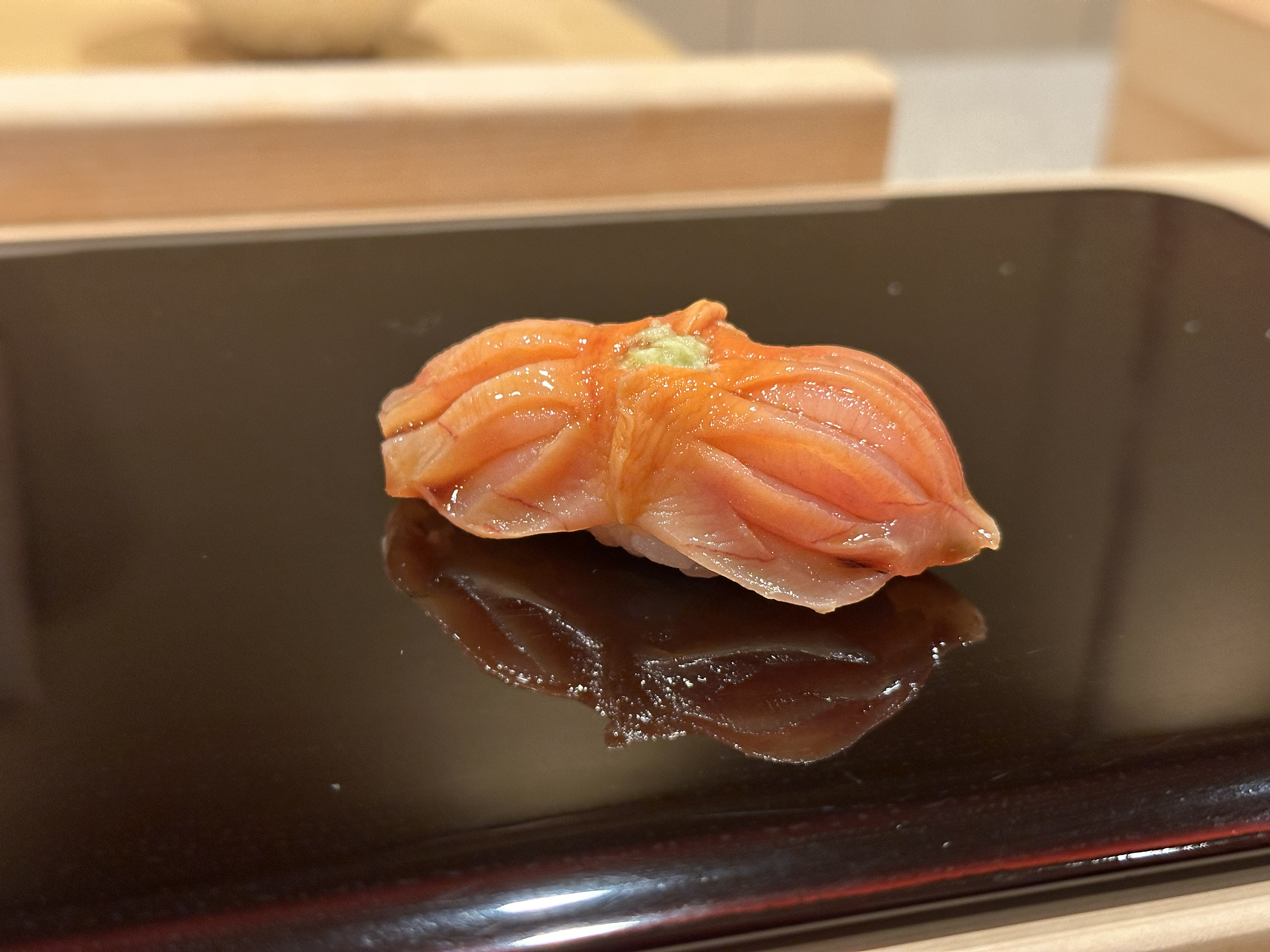
As sushi

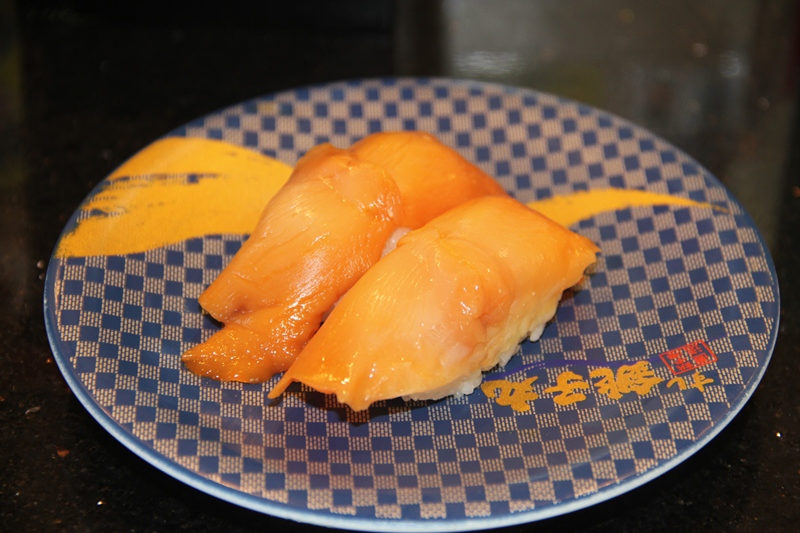
