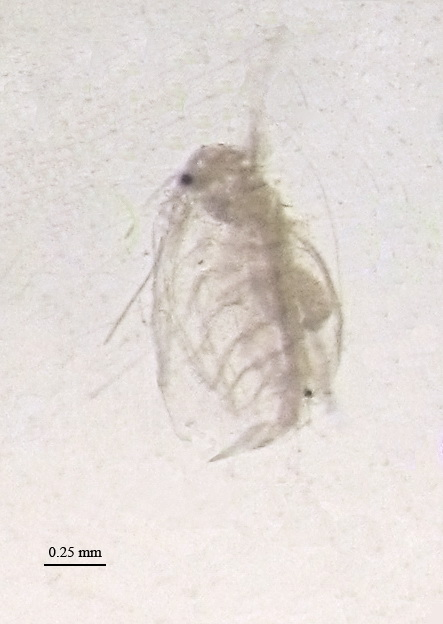

Scientific classification
- Domain: Eukaryota
- Kingdom: Animalia
- Phylum: Arthropoda
- Class: Branchiopoda
- Order: Ctenopoda
- Family: Sididae
- Genus: Penilia; Dana, 1849
- Species: P. avirostris

Binomial name
- Penilia avirostris Dana, 1849

= Penilia =

Genus of small freshwater animals

Penilia is a genus of ctenopods in the family Sididae. There is one described species in Penilia, P. avirostris.
