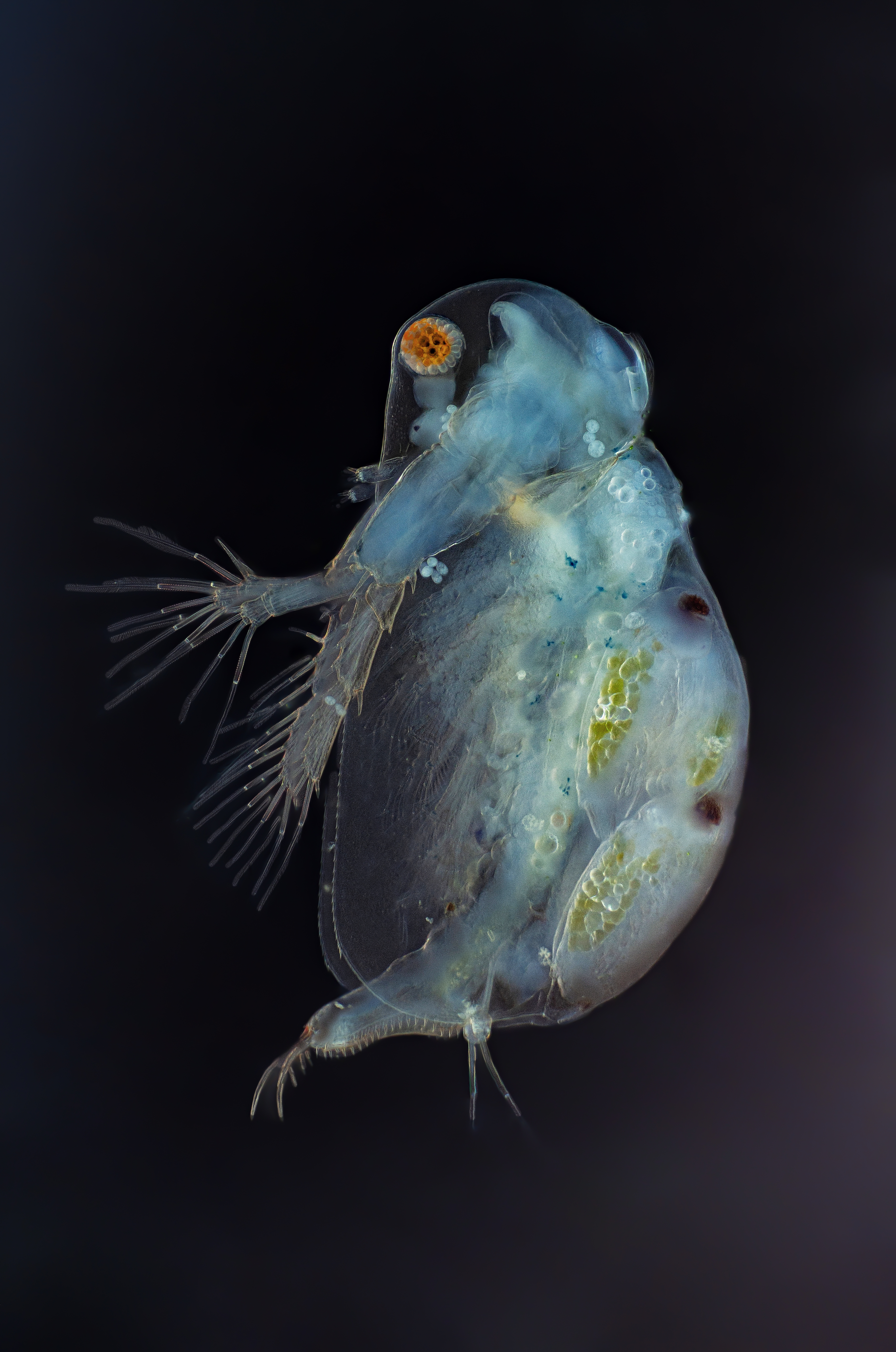
- Sida crystallina in Lääne-Viru County

Scientific classification
- Kingdom: Animalia
- Phylum: Arthropoda
- Clade: Pancrustacea
- Class: Branchiopoda
- Order: Ctenopoda
- Family: Sididae; Baird, 1850

= Sididae =

Family of small freshwater animals

Sididae is a family of ctenopods in the order Diplostraca. There are about 6 genera and at least 20 described species in Sididae. Some Sididae have accidentally been introduced by humans to areas outside of their native range.

== Genera ==
- Diaphanosoma Fischer, 1850
- Latona Straus, 1820
- Latonopsis G. O. Sars, 1888
- Penilia Dana, 1849
- Pseudosida Herrick, 1884
- Sida Straus, 1820
