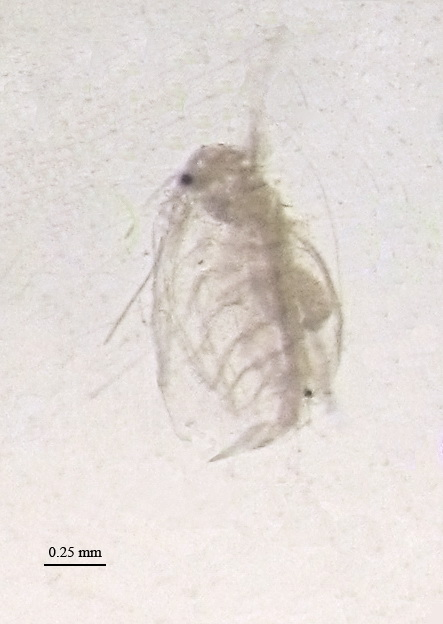
- Penilia avirostris

Scientific classification
- Kingdom: Animalia
- Phylum: Arthropoda
- Class: Branchiopoda
- Subclass: Phyllopoda
- Superorder: Diplostraca
- Order: Ctenopoda; G. O. Sars, 1865

Families
- Holopediidae G. O. Sars, 1865; Pseudopenilidae Korovchinsky & Sergeeva, 2008; Sididae Baird, 1850

= Ctenopoda =

Order of small freshwater animals

Ctenopoda, from Ancient Greek κτείς (kteís), meaning "comb", and πούς (poús), meaning "foot", are an order of the superorder Diplostraca, comprising the three families Holopediidae, Pseudopenilidae, and Sididae. Its members mostly live in fresh water, but Penilia is marine. Some Ctenopoda have accidentally been introduced by humans to areas outside of their native range.
