= Richard and Clara Winston =

20th-century American translators

Richard Winston (1917 – December 22, 1979) and Clara Brussel Winston (1921 – November 7, 1983), were prominent American translators of German works into English.

Richard and Clara were both born in New York and went to Brooklyn College. Richard and Clara began translating together in the late 1930s, working with the many German exiles in New York.

The Winstons translated over 150 books as well as many other works, and they received a number of awards for their translations. In 1978, they won the American Book Award for Uwe George's In the Deserts of This Earth. In 1972 then won the PEN Translation Prize for their translation of Letters of Thomas Mann. Their best known translations included the works of Thomas Mann, Franz Kafka, Hannah Arendt, Albert Speer, Hermann Hesse, and Rolf Hochhuth, among others.

In Richard's 1980 obituary in The New York Times, Clara described translation an interpretative art which relies on intuition. They could be "devoutly faithful" to some writers, but "helped [...] along" writers whom they considered less skilled, using their own discretion. The Winstons moved to a farm in Vermont in 1943, where they did their translation work.

The couple's archival papers are housed at Brooklyn College. Their daughter Krishna Winston is also a translator.

Both also wrote works of their own. Richard authored Charlemagne: From the Hammer to the Cross (1954) and Thomas Becket (1967), and Clara wrote the novels The Closest Kin There Is (1952), The Hours Together (1962), and Painting for the Show (1969). Together, they also wrote Notre-Dame De Paris (1971).
