= Uwe George =

German filmmaker (born 1940)

Uwe George (born April 1, 1940, in Kiel, Germany) is a prize-winning German documentary film maker, science editor and writer.

In the 1960s, he studied birds in the Sahara Desert and wrote several ornithology articles on the nesting behavior and breeding biology of desert birds.

George learned the trade of cameraman at North German Broadcasting, a public institution based in Hamburg, and won the 1970 Adolf Grimme Award for a television documentary on the Sahara. He produced another fifteen documentaries on the scientific study of deserts and the ecology of tropical rain forests.

His first book was published in 1976 with 114 illustrations, In den Wüsten dieser Erde (Hoffmann und Campe, 1976). Its first English language edition was published in the United States next year, translated by Richard and Clara Winston, In the Deserts of this World (Harcourt Brace, 1977). That work was recognized by the U.S. National Book Awardin category Translation.

Beginning in 1976, George worked for the German periodical GEO, first as a free-lance writer and since 1979 as a full-time employee: science editor, photographer, and expedition leader. He is the author of numerous books and has won several awards for photography. He won the Academy of Geoscience prize for journalists in 1993 and is honorary member of the Frankfurt Geographical Society since 1998. George won the annual Inge and Werner Grüter Award for science journalism in 2000, which cited "his outstanding contributions to the dissemination of scientific knowledge about desert research, botany, paleontology and evolution."
