= Eulimnadia =

Scientific classification
- Domain: Eukaryota
- Kingdom: Animalia
- Phylum: Arthropoda
- Class: Branchiopoda
- Order: Spinicaudata
- Family: Limnadiidae
- Genus: Eulimnadia; Packard, 1874

Genus of small freshwater animals

Eulimnadia is a genus of branchiopods in the family Limnadiidae. There are about 13 described species in Eulimnadia.

== Species ==
- Eulimnadia agassizii Packard, 1874
- Eulimnadia antillarum (Baird, 1852)
- Eulimnadia antlei Mackin, 1940
- Eulimnadia astraova Belk, 1989
- Eulimnadia cylindrova Belk, 1989
- Eulimnadia diversa Mattox, 1937
- Eulimnadia francescae
- Eulimnadia graniticola
- Eulimnadia inflecta
- Eulimnadia oryzae
- Eulimnadia stoningtonensis
- Eulimnadia texana (Packard, 1871)
- Eulimnadia thompsoni
- Eulimnadia ventricosa
