= Eulimnadia antlei =

Scientific classification
- Domain: Eukaryota
- Kingdom: Animalia
- Phylum: Arthropoda
- Class: Branchiopoda
- Order: Spinicaudata
- Family: Limnadiidae
- Genus: Eulimnadia
- Species: E. antlei

Binomial name
- Eulimnadia antlei Mackin, 1940

Species of small freshwater animal

Eulimnadia antlei is a species of branchiopod in the family Limnadiidae.
