= Eulimnadia texana =

Scientific classification
- Domain: Eukaryota
- Kingdom: Animalia
- Phylum: Arthropoda
- Class: Branchiopoda
- Order: Spinicaudata
- Family: Limnadiidae
- Genus: Eulimnadia
- Species: E. texana

Binomial name
- Eulimnadia texana (Packard, 1871)

Synonyms
- Limnadia texana Packard, 1871

Species of small freshwater animal

Eulimnadia texana, the Texas clam shrimp or desert shrimp, is a species belonging to the Limnadiidae family.

It is endemic to North America. It is an arid land specialist, living for many years as a cyst and bursting into life at the arrival of rains, maturing rapidly in temporary pools and producing eggs that can remain dormant until the next rains occur, perhaps in many years time.

== Description ==
Desert shrimps are sexually dimorphic. The males have their front two pairs of thoracic appendages modified into claws while the hermaphrodites have unmodified legs.

== Distribution and habitat ==
Desert shrimps live in ditches, ponds, pools, and other ephemeral freshwater habitats in northern Mexico and parts of the southern and southwestern United States, west of the Mississippi River.

== Biology ==
Individual shrimps are either male or hermaphrodite. The hermaphrodites can fertilize their own eggs or can mate with males but are unable to mate with other hermaphrodites. This arrangement is called androdioecy and is very rare among animals. The reproductive cycle varies between paired shrimps and isolated hermaphrodites and it is possible that using both strategies enhances the likelihood that fertile eggs will be available when the ephemeral water body in which they live dries up. Although to biologists, androdioecy seems a strategy unlikely to be successful, research using biogeographical, phylogenetic and paleontological evidence has shown that the practice has persisted in the genus Eulimnadia for 24 to 180 million years. The shrimps are omnivores and filter feeders, able to feed on the algae and microorganisms that also make use of the revived pool.

== Life cycle ==
In the Mojave Desert, standing water occurs for only a short time after it rains. Storms are a rare event, and when a downpour occurs in the summer (making the water warm enough), eggs of the desert shrimp spring into life. They have been lying in the dust and baked clay of a dried-up pool in a dormant state for years, looking like grains of sand. The nauplius larvae which hatch outgrow with great rapidity. They undergo metamorphosis and reach a reproductive size in four to seven days. Each hermaphrodite then produces clutches of up to 300 eggs once or twice a day. By the twelfth day of their lives, they may be 5 mm long. During the course of their short lives, each may produce thousands of eggs. If time allows, several generations may occur. When the water evaporates and little remains of their pool, they dig a hole in the mud and bury their eggs as the water level falls. By the time the pool has dried, the shrimps are desiccated corpses. However, their eggs live on, waiting for the next rainstorm which may be decades away. During the intervening years, desert winds may carry away some of the eggs and a few may end up in locations where water accumulates after rain. This allows the shrimp to colonize new areas without traveling while active.

Hermaphrodites live 25% to 50% longer than males in this species.
