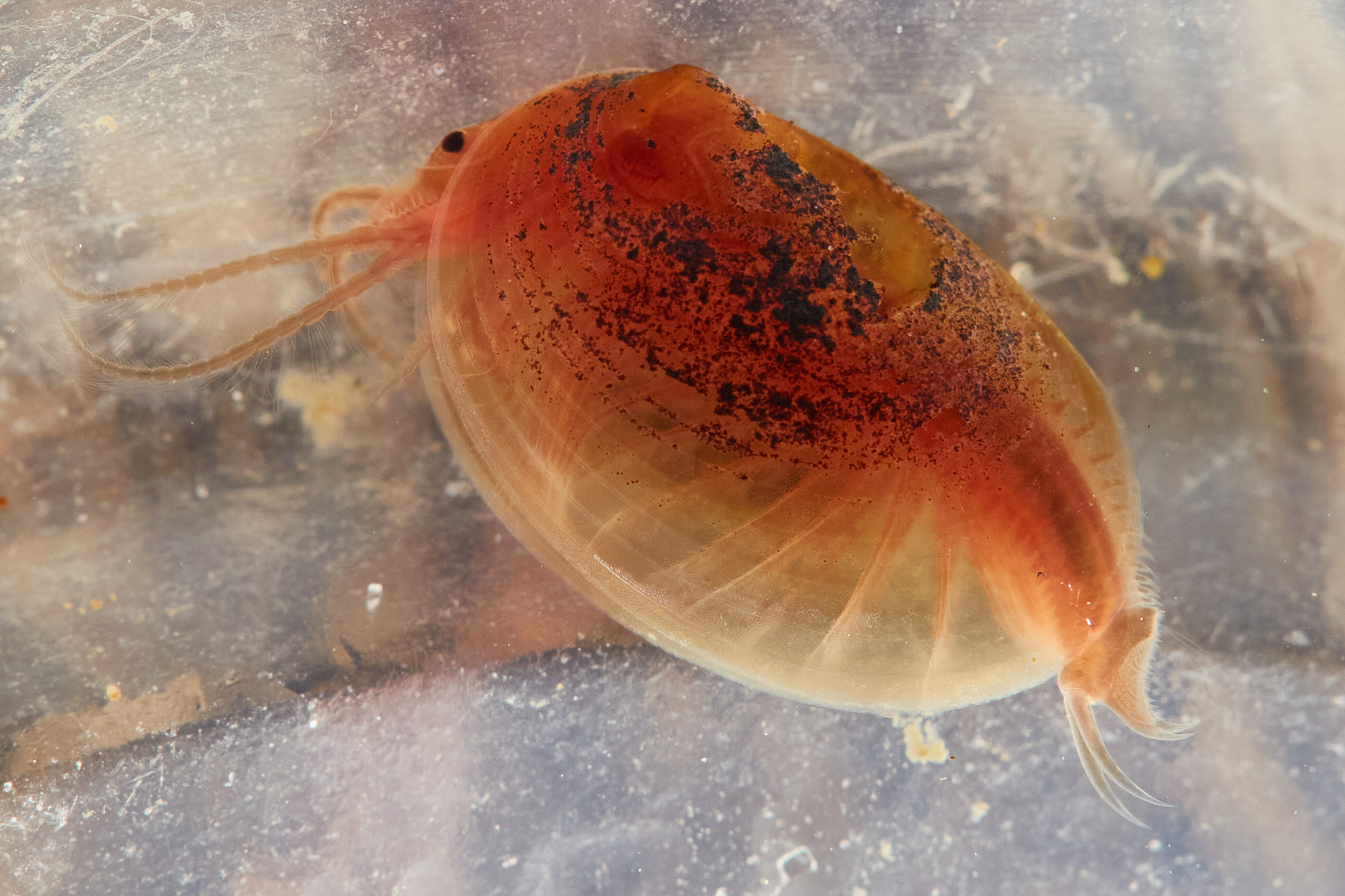

Conservation status
- Imperiled (NatureServe)

Scientific classification
- Kingdom: Animalia
- Phylum: Arthropoda
- Class: Branchiopoda
- Order: Spinicaudata
- Family: Cyzicidae
- Genus: Cyzicus
- Species: C. californicus

Binomial name
- Cyzicus californicus (Packard, 1874)

Synonyms
- Caenestheriella setosa Pearse, 1912; Caenestheriella setosa (Pearse, 1912) fide Schwentner et al. 2020; Cyzicus newcombii (Baird, 1886); Cyzicus setosus (Pearse, 1912); Estheria californicus Packard, 1874; Estheria setosa Pearse, 1912

= Cyzicus californicus =

Species of crustacean

Cyzicus californicus, the California clam shrimp or the setose clam shrimp, is a species of freshwater clam shrimp native to California.

== Taxonomy ==
Cyzicus californicus was first described as Estheria californica in 1874. However, the name Estheria now refers to a genus of parasitic flies, and the animal was subsequently moved to the genus Cyzicus.

C. californicus may be closely related to Cyzicus elongatus, as the two share many similar features.

== Description ==
Cyzicus californicus is about 0.45 in (11 mm) in length, 0.11 in (2.8 mm) in width, and 0.31 in (7.9 mm) in height. It possesses a flattened shell, the width of which is only 20% its length. This is similar to species in the genus Limnadia, but distinguishes it from the much wider shells of Cyzicus morsei and Cyzicus elongatus. The shell is nearly triangular when viewed from the front of the animal. The umbones, the part of the shell that forms first, are relatively small, and are located above the head. The top (dorsal) side of the shell is curved, further distinguishing it from the straight shell of C. elongatus. The sides of the shell are smooth and reflective, patterned with about 18 growth lines and an array of small bumps or granulations. The rostrum is relatively wide and short, the telson is relatively wide, and the antennae are relatively long. Spines are present on the back 16–18 body segments. Some sexual dimorphism is displayed, with the left and right side of the heads being spatula-shaped in males.

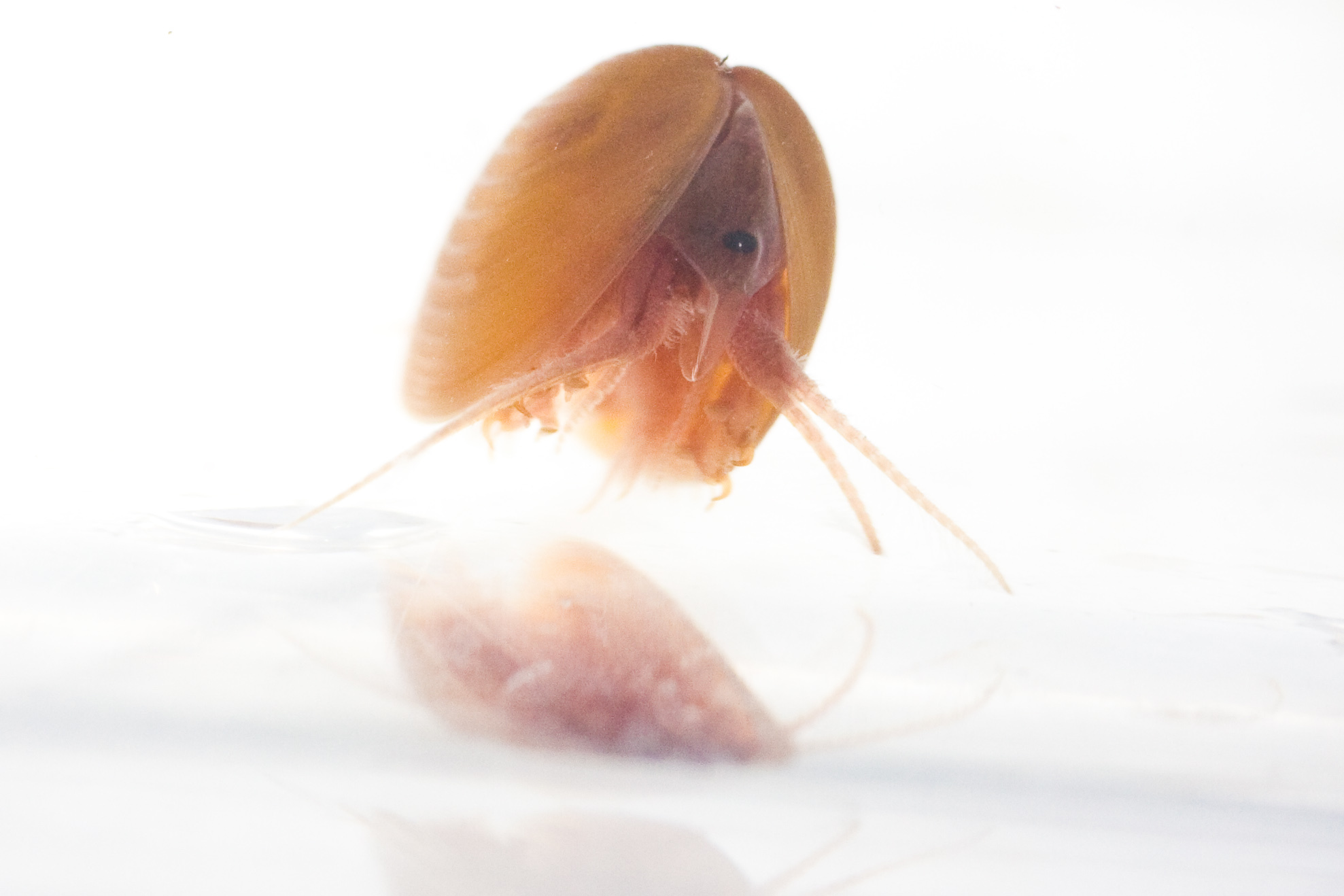
Front view of C. californicus

== Distribution, conservation, and ecology ==
Cyzicus californicus is estimated to occupy an area of between 5,000–20,000 km^{2} (1,900–7,700 sq mi), extending throughout the Californian Central Valley, Coast Ranges, and possibly into southern Oregon. This area is much larger than other Californian branchiopods, but it is still rare throughout. Its habitat is under strong pressure from land development, though it also lives in artificial refugia. Its habitat consists of relatively deep waters within seasonal wetlands, such as vernal pools, as well as in artificial bodies of water like ditches and stock ponds. It may coexist alongside other branchiopod species, including Branchinecta conservatio.

== Reproduction ==
Cyzicus californicus has a relatively slow life cycle for large Californian branchiopods. Within an experimental pond, C. californicus individuals matured in about 50 days from hatching, on average. About another 7 days were reported before reproduction was observed. Populations survived for 156 days on average, though this only occurred once the pools dried up.
