= Imnadia cristata =

Conservation status
- Vulnerable (IUCN 2.3)

Scientific classification
- Kingdom: Animalia
- Phylum: Arthropoda
- Class: Branchiopoda
- Order: Spinicaudata
- Family: Limnadiidae
- Genus: Imnadia
- Species: I. cristata

Binomial name
- Imnadia cristata Marinček, 1972

Species of small freshwater animal

Imnadia cristata is a species of crustaceans in the family Limnadiidae. It is endemic to Serbia and Montenegro.
