= Imnadia panonica =

Conservation status
- Vulnerable (IUCN 2.3)

Scientific classification
- Kingdom: Animalia
- Phylum: Arthropoda
- Class: Branchiopoda
- Order: Spinicaudata
- Family: Limnadiidae
- Genus: Imnadia
- Species: I. panonica

Binomial name
- Imnadia panonica Marinček & Petrov, 1984

Species of crustacean

Imnadia panonica is a species of crustaceans in the family Limnadiidae. It is endemic to Serbia and Montenegro.
