= Imnadia banatica =

Conservation status
- Vulnerable (IUCN 2.3)

Scientific classification
- Kingdom: Animalia
- Phylum: Arthropoda
- Class: Branchiopoda
- Order: Spinicaudata
- Family: Limnadiidae
- Genus: Imnadia
- Species: I. banatica

Binomial name
- Imnadia banatica Marincek & Petrov, 1982

Species of small freshwater animal

Imnadia banatica is a species of crustacean in the family Limnadiidae. It is endemic to Serbia and Montenegro.
