= Graceful clam shrimp =

Scientific classification
- Domain: Eukaryota
- Kingdom: Animalia
- Phylum: Arthropoda
- Class: Branchiopoda
- Order: Laevicaudata
- Family: Lynceidae
- Genus: Lynceus
- Species: L. gracilicornis

Binomial name
- Lynceus gracilicornis (Packard, 1871)

Synonyms
- Limnetis gracilicornis Packard, 1871

Species of small freshwater animal

The graceful clam shrimp (Lynceus gracilicornis) is a species of clam shrimp found in Texas, northern Florida and possibly other regions in between.

== Characteristics ==
This large clam shrimp presents a body colouration varying from orange to rose, and a dark maroon shell; the eggs carried by the female are yellow to orange. The species is distinguished from other Lynceidae members because the males have a pair of large claspers, with the right clasper being larger than the left. There are no growth marks on the carapace, as in other clam shrimp. Graceful clam shrimp swim upside down or on their side, using legs and antennae for backward propulsion.

== Ecology ==
Lynceus gracilicornis is usually found in the shallow grassy parts of temporary ponds. When oxygen levels are high, some individuals may be found in deep water. Graceful clam shrimp feed on plankton that they collect while swimming.

== Reproduction ==
The male clasps the lower margin of the female's shell and swims while holding her above him. Females carry up to 200 eggs under the carapace.
