= Lynceus brachyurus =

Scientific classification
- Domain: Eukaryota
- Kingdom: Animalia
- Phylum: Arthropoda
- Class: Branchiopoda
- Order: Laevicaudata
- Family: Lynceidae
- Genus: Lynceus
- Species: L. brachyurus

Binomial name
- Lynceus brachyurus O. F. Müller, 1776

Species of small freshwater animal

Lynceus brachyurus, known generally as the holarctic clam shrimp or common lynceus, is a species of clam shrimp in the family Lynceidae. It is found in Europe.
