= Estheria =

Estheria may refer to:

- Estheria (fly), a genus of tachinid flies in the family Tachinidae
- Lioestheria, a genus of crustacean from the Carboniferous period
- Cyzicus, an extant clam shrimp genus
