= Ziliujing Formation =

Geological formation in China

- Stratigraphic range: Hettangian-Toarcian, 201–174 Ma
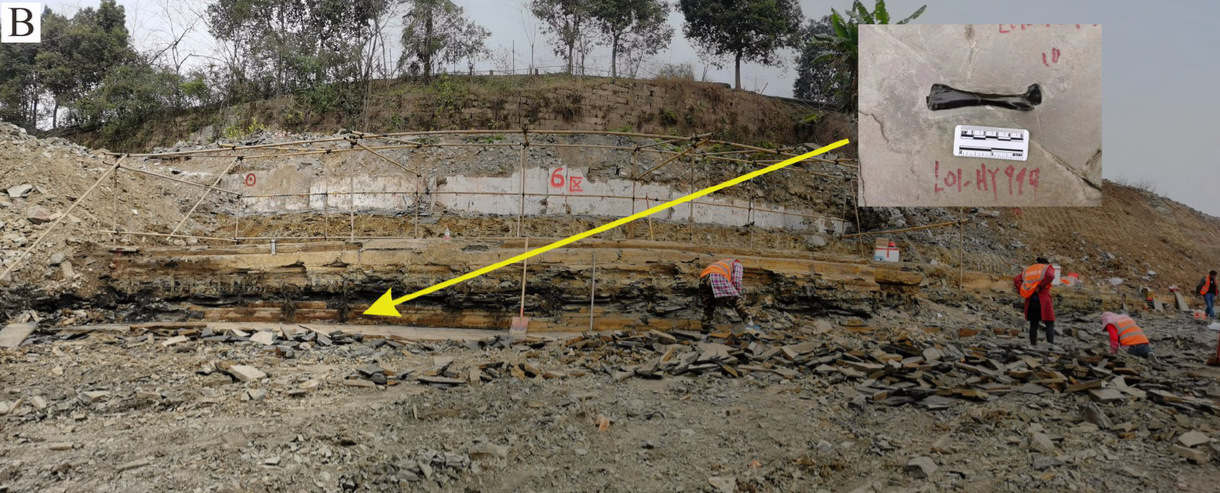
- Outcrop of the Ziliujing Formation which is also the type locality of Archaeocursor asiaticus
- Type: Geological formation
- Unit of: Ziliujing Group (sometimes synonymous)
- Sub-units: Qijiang Member, Zhenzhuchong Member (sometimes placed as a different formation), Dongyuemiao Member, Maanshan Member, Daanzhai Member
- Underlies: Xintiangou Formation
- Overlies: Zhenzhuchong Formation (Can be considered a member)
- Thickness: Dongyuemiao M. 5 to 11.2 metres (20 to 40 ft), Maanshan M. 131 to 180 metres (430 to 590 ft) Daanzhai M. 18 to 45.2 metres (60 to 150 ft)

Lithology
- Primary: Mudstone
- Other: Sandstone

Location
- Coordinates: 29.4°N 104.0°E
- Region: Sichuan
- Country: China
- Extent: Sichuan Basin

Type section
- Named for: Ziliujing District
- Ziliujing Formation (China) Ziliujing Formation (Sichuan)

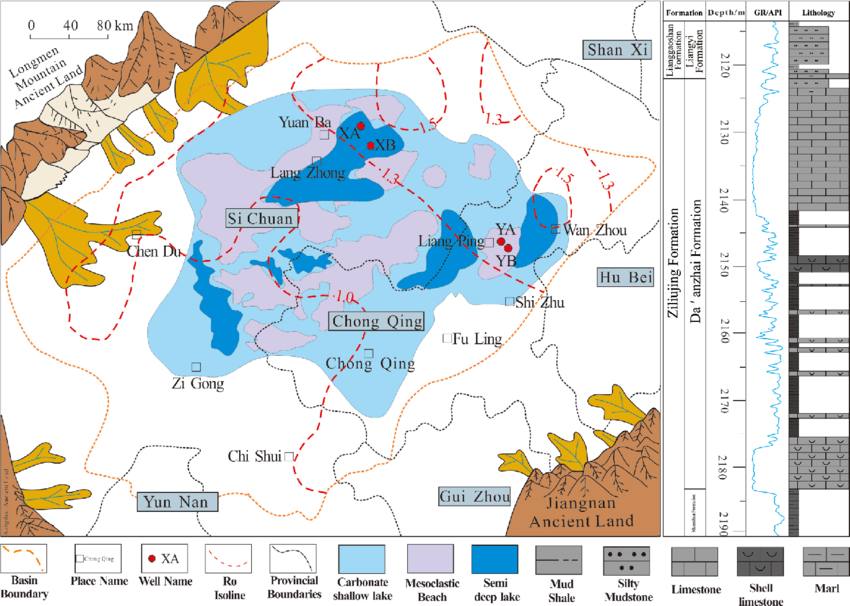
Paleogeographical reconstruction

The Ziliujing Formation (Or Ziliujing Group if the Zhenzhuchong Formation is considered different) is a geological formation in China, It is Early Jurassic in age. It is part of the stratigraphy of the Sichuan Basin. The dinosaur Gongxianosaurus and indeterminate theropod material are known from the Dongyuemiao Member of the formation, as well as dinosaur footprints, Zizhongosaurus and indeterminate prosauropods from the Da'anzhai Member. The basal sauropod Sanpasaurus is known from the Maanshan Member. The basal ornithschian Archaeocursor is known from the formation. A possible unnamed stegosaur and the pliosauroid plesiosaur Sinopliosaurus are also known from this formation but they were found an indeterminate member. An unnamed teleosaurid known from a complete skull has also been found in the formation, pending a formal description. The deposition environment during the Da'anzhai Member in the lower Toarcian is thought to have been that of a giant freshwater lake encompassing the whole of the Sichuan basin, around 3 times larger than Lake Superior, coeval with the Toarcian Oceanic Anoxic Event around 183 Ma. The Sinemurian-Pliensbachian boundary event (192.9 Ma) has been recorded on the top of the Dongyuemiao Member, while lower parts of this member are of Earliest Sinemurian age (around 199 Ma). Finally, the Triassic–Jurassic extinction is widely recorded in the Zhenzhuchong Member.

== Paleofauna ==
Color key: Taxon / Reclassified taxon / Taxon falsely reported as present / Dubious taxon or junior synonym / Ichnotaxon / Ootaxon / Morphotaxon	Notes; Uncertain or tentative taxa are in small text; ~~crossed out~~ taxa are discredited.

=== Bivalves ===
Genus	Species	Location	Section	Material	Notes	Images
Acuneopsis	A. luochengensis	Luocheng, Jianwei	Dongyuemiao Member	Isolated Shells	A freshwater mussel, considered a member of the family Unionidae inside Unionida. Ecological indicator of shallow zone of the big fresh-water lake under a hot climate	
Apseudocardinia	A. hupehensis	Xiangxi, Zigui	Dongyuemiao Member	Isolated Shells	A freshwater clam, member of the family Pseudocardiniidae inside Trigoniida.	
Cuneopsis	C. wanxianensis	Shizi wan, Weiyuan county; Huangshiban, Weiyuan county	Maanshan Member	Isolated Shells	A freshwater mussel, member of the family Unionidae inside Unionida.	
Eolamprotula	L. (Eolamprotula) cremeri	Luocheng, Jianwei	Dongyuemiao Member	Isolated Shells	A freshwater mussel, member of the family Unionidae inside Unionida.	Lamprotula
Luochengella	L. luochengensis	Luocheng, Jianwei	Dongyuemiao Member	Isolated Shells	A freshwater mussel, member of the family Unionidae inside Unionida.	
Modiolus	M. yunnanensis; M. sichuanensis	Shizi wan, Weiyuan county; Huangshiban, Weiyuan county	Maanshan Member	Isolated Shells	A freshwater mussel, member of the family Mytilidae inside Mytiloida.	
Palaeunio	U. (Palaeunio) sichuanensis	Dakang, Zhongba	Dongyuemiao Member	Isolated Shells	A freshwater mussel, member of the family Unionidae inside Unionida.	
Palaeomargaritifera	M. (Palaeomargaritifera) qianweiensis	Shizi wan, Weiyuan county; Huangshiban, Weiyuan county	Maanshan Member	Isolated Shells	A freshwater mussel, member of the family Margaritiferidae inside Unionida.	Margaritifera
Pseudocardinia	P. inflata; P. ventricosa; P. elliptica; P. aff. yangziensis; P. hupehensis; P. angulata; P. kweichouensis; P. carinata	Shizi wan, Weiyuan county; Huangshiban, Weiyuan county	Maanshan Member	Isolated Shells	A freshwater clam, member of the family Pseudocardiniidae inside Trigoniida.	
Psilunio	P. thailandicus; P. giganteus	Shizi wan, Weiyuan county; Huangshiban, Weiyuan county	Maanshan Member	Isolated Shells	A freshwater mussel, member of the family Unionidae inside Unionida.	

=== Gastropods ===
Genus	Species	Location	Section	Material	Notes	Images
Lioplacodes	L. orientalis	Yuzhou Biota	Dongyuemiao member	Shells	A freshwater snail, member of the family Viviparidae	

=== Phyllopods ===
Genus	Species	Location	Section	Material	Notes	Images
Euestheria	E. taniiformis; E. changtanensis; E. elegans; E. elongata; E. khinganensis; E. orientalis; E. shandanensis; E. shandongensis	Houchiatsun, sichuan province; Potzewan, sichuan province; Shizi wan, Weiyuan county; Huangshiban, Weiyuan county; Luocheng, Jianwei; Dakang, Zhongba; Xiangxi, Zigui	Dongyuemiao member; Maanshan member; Daanzhai member	Valves	A clam shrimp ("conchostracan"), member of the family Lioestheriinae.	
Iliestheria	I. nilkaensis; I. xinjiangensis	Houchiatsun, sichuan province; Potzewan, sichuan province; Shizi wan, Weiyuan county; Huangshiban, Weiyuan county; Luocheng, Jianwei; Dakang, Zhongba; Xiangxi, Zigui	Dongyuemiao member; Maanshan member; Daanzhai member	Valves	A clam shrimp ("conchostracan"), member of the family Triglyptidae.	
Lioestheria	L. shimamurai	Houchiatsun, sichuan province; Potzewan, sichuan province; Shizi wan, Weiyuan county; Huangshiban, Weiyuan county; Luocheng, Jianwei; Dakang, Zhongba; Xiangxi, Zigui	Dongyuemiao member; Maanshan member; Daanzhai member	Valves	A clam shrimp ("conchostracan"), member of the family Lioestheriinae.	
Loxomegaglypta	L. dafangensis	Houchiatsun, sichuan province; Potzewan, sichuan province; Shizi wan, Weiyuan county; Huangshiban, Weiyuan county; Luocheng, Jianwei; Dakang, Zhongba; Xiangxi, Zigui	Dongyuemiao member; Maanshan member; Daanzhai member	Valves	A clam shrimp ("conchostracan"), member of the family Triglyptidae.	
Loxomicroglypta	L. laohugouensis; L. liaoxiensis; L. kirgizica	Houchiatsun, sichuan province; Potzewan, sichuan province; Shizi wan, Weiyuan county; Huangshiban, Weiyuan county; Luocheng, Jianwei; Dakang, Zhongba; Xiangxi, Zigui	Dongyuemiao member; Maanshan member; Daanzhai member	Valves	A clam shrimp ("conchostracan"), member of the family Triglyptidae.	
Ovjurium	O. cf.ubsanuri; O. yixianensis	Houchiatsun, sichuan province; Potzewan, sichuan province; Shizi wan, Weiyuan county; Huangshiban, Weiyuan county; Luocheng, Jianwei; Dakang, Zhongba; Xiangxi, Zigui	Dongyuemiao member; Maanshan member; Daanzhai member	Valves	A clam shrimp ("conchostracan"), member of the family Ovjuridae.	
Palaeolimnadia	P. baitianbaensis; P. acuta; P. baoxingensis; P. chuanbeiensis; P. dachaidanensis; P. diannanensis; P. dundugobica; P. exiensis; P. grandis; P. guangyuanensis; P. intermedia; P. hubeiensis; P. kangnaiensis; P. lingguanensis; P. longmenshanensis; P. longyinensis; P. parva; P. menglaensis; P. pengxianensis; P. rhombica; P. semicircularis; P. sichuanensis; P. subcircularis; P. subtriangularis; P. venusta; P. xiaomeigouensis; P. yangziensis	Houchiatsun, sichuan province; Potzewan, sichuan province; Shizi wan, Weiyuan county; Huangshiban, Weiyuan county; Luocheng, Jianwei; Dakang, Zhongba; Xiangxi, Zigui	Dongyuemiao member; Maanshan member; Daanzhai member	Valves	A clam shrimp ("conchostracan"), member of the family Limnadiidae. The species Palaeolimnadia baitianbaensis represent the main member of its own fauna section, that comprises other 52 species of Phyllopods	
Pseudolimnadia	P. reticulata; P. weixinensis	Houchiatsun, sichuan province; Potzewan, sichuan province; Shizi wan, Weiyuan county; Huangshiban, Weiyuan county; Luocheng, Jianwei; Dakang, Zhongba; Xiangxi, Zigui	Dongyuemiao member; Maanshan member; Daanzhai member	Valves	A clam shrimp ("conchostracan"), member of the family Limnadiidae.	
Pseudestheria	P. cf. subovata; P. tanii	Houchiatsun, sichuan province; Potzewan, sichuan province; Shizi wan, Weiyuan county; Huangshiban, Weiyuan county; Luocheng, Jianwei; Dakang, Zhongba; Xiangxi, Zigui	Dongyuemiao member; Maanshan member; Daanzhai member	Valves	A clam shrimp ("conchostracan"), member of the family Lioestheriinae.	

=== Insects ===
Type	Location	Section	Material	Made By	Images
Hole Feeding	Qilixia section, Xuanhan	Zhenzhuchong Member	Circular to ellipsoidal holes punched through leaf tissue	Unknown	
Margin Feeding	Qilixia section, Xuanhan	Zhenzhuchong Member	Arc-shaped or irregular excisions along leaf margins and apices	Unknown	
Surface Feeding	Qilixia section, Xuanhan	Zhenzhuchong Member	Strip-like abrasions or abraded lamina surfaces between parallel veins	Unknown	
Piercing and Sucking	Qilixia section, Xuanhan	Zhenzhuchong Member	Concave or convex punctures into the leaf tissue, often with a central depression	Unknown	
Oviposition	Qilixia section, Xuanhan	Zhenzhuchong Member	Oval to lenticular scars, often oriented parallel to venation or stem axis, with callus tissue	Unknown	
Galling	Qilixia section, Xuanhan	Zhenzhuchong Member	Rounded to ellipsoid galls on leaf surfaces, rachises or between veins	Unknown	

=== Fish ===
Genus	Species	Location	Section	Material	Notes	Images
Ceratodontiformes indet.	Indeteminate	Yuzhou Biota	Dongyuemiao member	Partial and semicomplete specimens: SSGT TXH132, SSGT THS2716.	Incertade Sedis	
Ceratodus	C. szechuanensis	Houchiatsun, sichuan province; Weiyuan, Szechuan	Maanshan Member	Isolated tooth plates	A Lungfish of the family Ceratodontidae.	Ceratodus reconstruction
Ginglymodi indet.	Indeteminate	Yuzhou Biota	Dongyuemiao member	Several complete specimens: SSGT JK062, SSGT L01-HY892, SSGT JK004	Incertade Sedis	
Hybodontiformes indet.	Indeteminate	Yuzhou Biota	Dongyuemiao member	Dorsal fin-spine, SSGT L01-HY224; Tooth, SSGT TX01; Coprolites SSGT CQ-YF02, SSGT CQ-YF04, SSGT L01-HY1011, SSGT L01-HY283	Incertade Sedis	
Lepidotes	L. chunkingensis; L. luchowensis; L. minor	Houchiatsun, sichuan province; Potzewan, sichuan province	Maanshan Member	Complete Specimens; Isolated Scales; Isolated Teeth	A member of the family Lepidotidae.	Lepidotes
Ptycholepiformes indet.	Indeteminate	Yuzhou Biota	Dongyuemiao member	Complete specimen, SSGT JK029	Incertade Sedis	
Sinoceratodus	S. fortunus	Yuzhou Biota	Dongyuemiao Member	SSGT L01-HY-661, SSGT L01-HY-855, THS2715	A Lungfish of the group Ceratodontoidei.	
Teleostei indet.	Indeteminate	Yuzhou Biota	Dongyuemiao member	Complete specimens, SSGT L01-HY269-2, SSGT L01-HY749, SSGT JXL1062	Incertade Sedis	

=== Plesiosaurs ===
Genus	Species	Location	Section	Material	Notes	Images
Bishanopliosaurus	B. youngi	Bishan county, sichuan province; Yuzhou Biota	Dongyuemiao Member	IVPP V 5869, an incomplete postcranial skeleton of a young individual; Referred SSGT T035, SSGT C078, SSGT JHSY60	A plesiosaur, considered a member of the family Rhomaleosauridae. An unusual freshwater plesiosaur linked to the large Sichuan Lake system developed locally.	Bishanopliosaurus
Sinopliosaurus	S. weiyuanensis	Houchiatsun, sichuan province; Potzewan, sichuan province	Maanshan Member	IVPP V.140, isolated remains; IVPP V.229, V.157, several isolated remains	A plesiosaur, considered a member of the family Pliosauridae. Likely an invalid genus of freshwater pliosaur	

=== Testudinata ===
Genus	Species	Location	Section	Material	Notes	Images
Chelonipus	cf.C. isp.	Yaocun tracksite	Maanshan Member	Footprints	Potentially the largest turtle tracks currently known from China and an example of one of the earliest known globally	
Testudinata indet.	Indeterminate	Houchiatsun, sichuan province; Weiyuan, Szechuan	Dongyuemiao Member; Maanshan Member	Fragments of Shells	Turtle remains of uncertain affinity. The only major turtle remains recovered in this unit. This along some undescribed shell fragments from the Lower Jurassic of Sichuan appear to represent the first documented occurrence of the fossil Testudines in China	

=== Crocodylomorphs ===
Genus	Species	Location	Section	Material	Notes	Images
Teleosaurinae indet.	Indeterminate	Daxian, Szechuan	Dongyuemiao Member	IVPP V 10098, a complete skull	A teleosaur, considered a member of the family Teleosaurinae. An unusual freshwater teleosauroid, previously referred Peipehsuchus teleorhinus.	Skull of the Ziliujing teleosaurid
Teleosaurus?	T.? sp.	Tatsu, Chongqing	Dongyuemiao Member	Single scute	A teleosaur, considered a member of the family Teleosaurinae.	

=== Dinosaurs ===
==== Ornithischians ====
Genus	Species	Location	Section	Material	Notes	
Anomoepus	A. isp.	Wucha Village; Yuanbaoqing tracksite, Guizhou Province	Maanshan Member	Footprints	Ornithischian footprints	
Archaeocursor	A. asiaticus	Chongqing Central Park	Dongyuemiao Member	Nearly complete left femur, SSGT L01-HY999	An early ornithischian	Archaeocursor
Ornithopoda indet.	Indeterminate	Hulukou, Huangshiban	Maanshan Member	Isolated Remains	Incertade Sedis	
Thyreophora? indet.	Stegosauria? Indet.; "Gen. indet. imperfectus"	Changshanling, Potzewan; Kuantsaishan, Houchiatsun	Maanshan Member	IVPP V.219, four fragments of spines; An anterior caudal vertebra, a distal end of a left femur, a left tibia, a right fibula, and right foot with a few elements missing	"Gen. indet. imperfectus" represents a large possible ornithischian or a sauropod that was originally assigned to Sanpasaurus.	

==== Sauropodomorphs ====
Genus	Species	Location	Section	Material	Notes	
Brontopodus	B. isp.; Cf.B. isp.	Gulin County, Sichuan Province; Hejie tracksite, Sichuan Province; Wucha Village; Yuanbaoqing tracksite, Guizhou Province	Daanzhai Member; Maanshan Member	Footprints	Sauropod footprints which resemble the pes of some mamenchisaurids. Associated Brontopodus-like trackway with Liujianpus indicates that small and large sauropodomorphs may have co-existed.	
Cetiosauridae indet.	Indeterminate	Hulukou, Huangshiban, Sichuan Province; Shiziling Tiefo, Sichuan Province	Daanzhai Member	IVPP V9070, desarticulated postcraneal skeleton; Isolated dorsal vertebrae; Tibia	Incertade Sedis	
Gongxianosaurus	G. shibeiensis; G. sp.	Shibei Township, Gongxian County	Dongyuemiao Member	Four complete and incomplete skeletons are similar in both size and appearance; A large number of scapula, dorsal vertebrae and ilium, and a complete caudal system with 51 centra	A sauropod that may represent a late-surviving basal member of the group.	
"Gyposaurus"	"G. sinensis"	Dafang County	Zhenzhuchong Member	Incomplete skeleton with nearly complete skull	Incertade Sedis	
Lufengosaurus?	L.? sp.	Hulin, Weiyuan; Liangshuijing, Zigong; Weixin area, Yunnan Province	Daanzhai member; Zhenzhuchong Member	ZDM 0011: Damaged dentary with a tooth; isolated ungual phalanx; Uncertain Remains	A sauropodomorph of the family Massospondylidae.	Lufengosaurus
Liujianpus	L. shunan; cf. L. isp.	Changhebian site, Sichuan Province; Dazhuanwan site, Guizhou Province; Gulin County, Sichuan Province; Hejie site, Sichuan Province; Wucha Village; Yantan tracksite, Guizhou Province; Yaocun tracksite	Daanzhai Member; Maanshan Member	Footprints	This ichnogenus dominates all the track assemblages where it is found, with a presence of up the 97%.	
Mamenchisauridae indet.	Indeterminate	Gulin County, Sichuan Province; Shapingpa, Chongqing country; Chinkangpei, Chongqing country; Datienwan, Chongqing country; Chongqing suburbs, Chongqing country	Daanzhai Member; Maanshan Member	Associated Tibia, femur and isolated Phalages; Several caudal vertebrae; Dorsal vertebra; Vertebra (caudal?)	Incertade Sedis	
Parabrontopodus	P. isp.; cf. P. isp.	Hejie tracksite, Zigong City; Wucha Village; Yaocun tracksite	Maanshan Member	Footprints	Sauropod footprints. The narrow-gauge trackway pattern resembles Parabrontopodus, well known from the Jurassic, but other features, such as the low heteropody, are different.	
Plateosauridae indet.	Indeterminate	Huangshiban cross-section	Zhenzhuchong Member	Single skeleton	Incertade Sedis	
Qianlong	Q. shouhu	Zhuanpo, Pingba District	Zhenzhuchong Member	Three partial semi-articulated skeletons (GZPM VN001, 002, and 003); Five clutches of embryo-containing eggs	A sauropodomorph; the associated clutch provides strong evidence for the earliest known leathery eggs.	Qianlong
Sanpasaurus	S. yaoi	Weiyuan, Szechuan	Maanshan Member	IVPP V156A (IVPP V156 partim); Disarticulated middle-posterior dorsal vertebral series, consisting of three complete centra with partial neural arches.; IVPP V156B; two centra from the dorsal vertebral series	A sauropod with uncertain affinities inside the group. Originally interpreted it as the remains of an ornithopod ornithischian.	Sanpasaurus
"Shunosaurus"	"S." ziliujingensis	Loquanjing, Sichuan country	Maanshan Member	Uncatalogued Partial skeleton	A sauropod, referred to the family Shunosaurinae. Likely not Shunosaurus. It was described in the Zigong Museum Guide	Shunosaurus
"Yibinosaurus"	"Y. zhoui"	Shibei Township, Gongxian County	Dongyuemiao Member	Partial disarticulated skeleton	"Yibinosaurus" is from the same locality as Gongxianosaurus and may be the same as Gongxianosaurus sp. nov.	
Zizhongosaurus	Z. chuanchensis; "Z. huangshibanensis"	Loquanjing, Sichuan country; Huangshiban, Weiyuan County	Maanshan Member	A dorsal spine, a distal end of pubis and a fragmentary humerus; Uncertain Remains	A sauropod, referred to the family Vulcanodontidae or Shunosaurinae. It builds its own faunal section, yet some authors view it as a nomen dubium.	

==== Theropods ====
Didactyl tracks, that are interpreted as either artifact of preservation or Dromaeosauridae convergent, are found at Wucha Village.

Genus	Species	Location	Section	Material	Notes	Images
Elaphrosaurinae? indet.	Indeterminate	Kuantsaishan, Houchiatsun	Maanshan Member	IVPP V.138, Four vertebrae and a distal part of a metatarsus	Resemblance to the genus Elaphrosaurus, initially thought to be a member of Coeluridae.	
Eubrontes	E. (Weiyuanpus) zigongensis; cf. E. giganteus; E. isp.	Gulin County, Sichuan Province; Shaba tracksite; Wuli site	Daanzhai Member; Ma'anshan Member; Zhenzhuchong Member	Footprints	Theropod footprints of uncertain affinity, probably related to theropods such as Dilophosaurus	
Grallator	G. ssatoi; G. isp.	Dongyuemiao tracksite, Sichuan Province; Gulin County, Sichuan Province; Hejie site, Sichuan Province; Wucha Village; Wuli site	Daanzhai Member; Maanshan Member	Footprints	Theropod footprints of uncertain affinity. Includes some of the smallest Grallator (and avian theropod) tracks ever described in the literature.	Grallator
Neotheropoda indet.	Indeterminate	Shibei Township, Gongxian County	Dongyuemiao Member	Isolated Teeth; Isolated Vertebrae	Incertade Sedis	
Sinosaurus	S. sp.	Dafang County	Zhenzhuchong Member	Multiple articulated and desarticulated remains	An Averostriform theropod	Sinosaurus

== Flora ==
Genus	Species	Location	Stratigraphic position	Material	Notes	Images
Anomozamites	A. cf. gracilis	Yangtze Gorges area	Dongyuemiao Member	Leaflets	Affinities with the Bennettitales inside Bennettitopsida.	Anomozamites specimen
Baiera	B. kidoi; B. sp.	Badong-Lichuan; Yuzhou Biota	Dongyuemiao Member	Leaflets	Affinities with Karkeniaceae inside Ginkgoales.	Example of Baiera specimen
Cladophlebis	C. sp.	Qilixia section, Xuanhan County; Yangtze Gorges area	Dongyuemiao Member; Zhenzhuchong Member	Isolated pinnae	Affinities with Osmundaceae inside Osmundales.	Cladophlebis nebbensis specimen
Clathropteris	C. meniscioides; C. platyphylla	Yangtze Gorges area	Dongyuemiao Member	Isolated pinnae	Affinities with Dipteridaceae inside Polypodiales.	Example of Clathropteris meniscioides specimen
Coniopteris	C. cf. burejensis; C. hymenophylloides; C. murrayana	Qilixia section, Xuanhan County; Yangtze Gorges area	Dongyuemiao Member; Zhenzhuchong Member	Isolated pinnae	Affinities with Dicksoniaceae inside Cyatheales.	Coniopteris specimen
Cycadites	C. sp. nov.	Yangtze Gorges area	Dongyuemiao Member	Leaflets	Affinities with Cycadales inside Cycadopsida.	Cycadites specimen
Dictyophyllum	D. nathorsti; D. nilssoni	Yangtze Gorges area	Dongyuemiao Member	Isolated pinnae	Affinities with Dipteridaceae inside Polypodiales.	Dictyophyllum nilssonii specimen
Equisetites	E. lateralis; E. columnaris; E. filus; Equisetites sp.	Yangtze Gorges area; Yuzhou Biota; Hechuan, Chongqing	Dongyuemiao Member	Stems	Affinities with Equisetaceae inside Equisetales.	Example of Equisetites specimen
Ferganiella	F. podozamiodes	Yangtze Gorges area	Dongyuemiao Member	Leaflets	Affinities with Krassiloviaceae inside Voltziales.	
Ginkgoites	G. sp.	Badong-Lichuan	Dongyuemiao Member	Leaflets	Affinities with Ginkgoaceae inside Ginkgoales.	Ginkgoites specimen
Klukia	K. exilis	Yangtze Gorges area	Dongyuemiao Member	Isolated pinnae	Affinities with Schizaeaceae inside Schizaeales. Grass Ferns	Example of Klukia exilis specimen
Nilssonia	N. xilinhotensis; N. inouyei	Yuzhou Biota	Dongyuemiao Member	Leaflets	Affinities with Nilssoniales within Cycadophyta or Bennettitales.	Nilssonia specimen
Neocalamites	N. sp.	Qilixia section, Xuanhan County	Zhenzhuchong Member	Stems	Affinities with Equisetaceae inside Equisetales.	
Otozamites	O. mixomorphus; O. hsiangchiensis; O. nalajingensis	Yangtze Gorges area	Dongyuemiao Member	Leaflets	Affinities with Williamsoniaceae inside Bennettitales.	Otozamites specimen
Phlebopteris	P. cf. polypodioides	Yangtze Gorges area	Dongyuemiao Member	Isolated pinnae	Affinities with Matoniaceae inside Gleicheniales.	Example of Phlebopteris specimen
Podozamites	P. schenki; P. lanceolatus	Badong-Lichuan; Qilixia section, Xuanhan County	Dongyuemiao Member; Zhenzhuchong Member	Leaflets	Affinities with Krassiloviaceae inside Voltziales.	Podozamites reconstruction
Stachypteris	S.? anomala	Yangtze Gorges area	Dongyuemiao Member	Isolated pinnae	Affinities with Schizaeaceae inside Schizaeales.	
Storgaardia	S. sp.	Qilixia section, Xuanhan County	Zhenzhuchong Member	Leaflets	Affinities with Krassiloviaceae inside Voltziales.	
Thaumatopteris	T. sp.	Qilixia section, Xuanhan County	Zhenzhuchong Member	Isolated pinnae	Affinities with Dipteridaceae inside Polypodiales.	
Todites	T. princeps	Qilixia section, Xuanhan County	Zhenzhuchong Member	Isolated pinnae / pinnules	Affinities with Osmundaceae inside Osmundales.	

== See also ==
- Blue Lias, England
- Charmouth Mudstone Formation, England
- Jurensismergel Formation, Germany
- Posidonia Shale, Germany
- Sorthat Formation, Denmark
- Hasle Formation, Denmark
- Zagaje Formation, Poland
- Drzewica Formation, Poland
- Ciechocinek Formation, Poland
- Borucice Formation, Poland
- Rotzo Formation, Italy
- Saltrio Formation, Italy
- Moltrasio Formation, Italy
- Marne di Monte Serrone, Italy
- Calcare di Sogno, Italy
- Podpeč Limestone, Slovenia
- Coimbra Formation, Portugal
- El Pedregal Formation, Spain
- Fernie Formation, Canada
- Whiteaves Formation, British Columbia
- Navajo Sandstone, Utah
- Yanan Formation, China
- Aganane Formation, Morocco
- Tafraout Group, Morocco
- Azilal Formation, Morocco
- Budoš Limestone, Montenegro
- Kota Formation, India
- Cañadón Asfalto Formation, Argentina
- Los Molles Formation, Argentina
- Kandreho Formation, Madagascar
- Elliot Formation, South Africa
- Clarens Formation, South Africa
- Evergreen Formation, Australia
- Cattamarra Coal Measures, Australia
- Hanson Formation, Antarctica
- Mawson Formation, Antarctica
