= Lynceus (disambiguation) =

Lynceus was a king of Argos, succeeding Danaus on the throne.

Lynceus or Lynkeus may also refer to:

- Lynceus of Samos, Greek writer
- Josef Popper-Lynkeus (1838-1922), Austrian scholar and inventor
- Lynceus, name of multiple Greek mythological figures.
- Lynceus (crustacean), a crustacean genus
