= Leptestheria compleximanus =

Scientific classification
- Kingdom: Animalia
- Phylum: Arthropoda
- Class: Branchiopoda
- Order: Spinicaudata
- Family: Leptestheriidae
- Genus: Leptestheria
- Species: L. compleximanus

Binomial name
- Leptestheria compleximanus Packard, 1877

Synonyms
- Estheria compleximanus Packard, 1877; Eulimnadia compleximanus Packard, 1877; Leptestheria pestai Daday, 1923; Leptestheria vanhoffeni Daday, 1923; Leptestheria vanhoffeni variabilis Daday, 1923

Species of clam shrimp

Leptestheria compleximanus is a species of North American clam shrimp known by the common name playa clam shrimp or spineynose clam shrimp.

== Range ==
Leptestheria compleximanus is found from the Great Plains region of the United States to the deserts of northern Mexico.

== Habitat ==
Playa clam shrimp live in temporary wetlands.

== Ecology ==
Ephemeral wetland specialists, Leptestheria compleximanus depend on wet-dry cycles. Their life cycle has evolved to depend on drying to the point that all eggs they lay are desiccation-resistant and will not hatch during the same wet cycle during which adults are alive. These eggs will need to experience dry conditions followed by another inundation cycle to break diapause and hatch.

While alive, playa clam shrimp feed on suspended particles through filter feeding and searching through soft mud for food particles.
