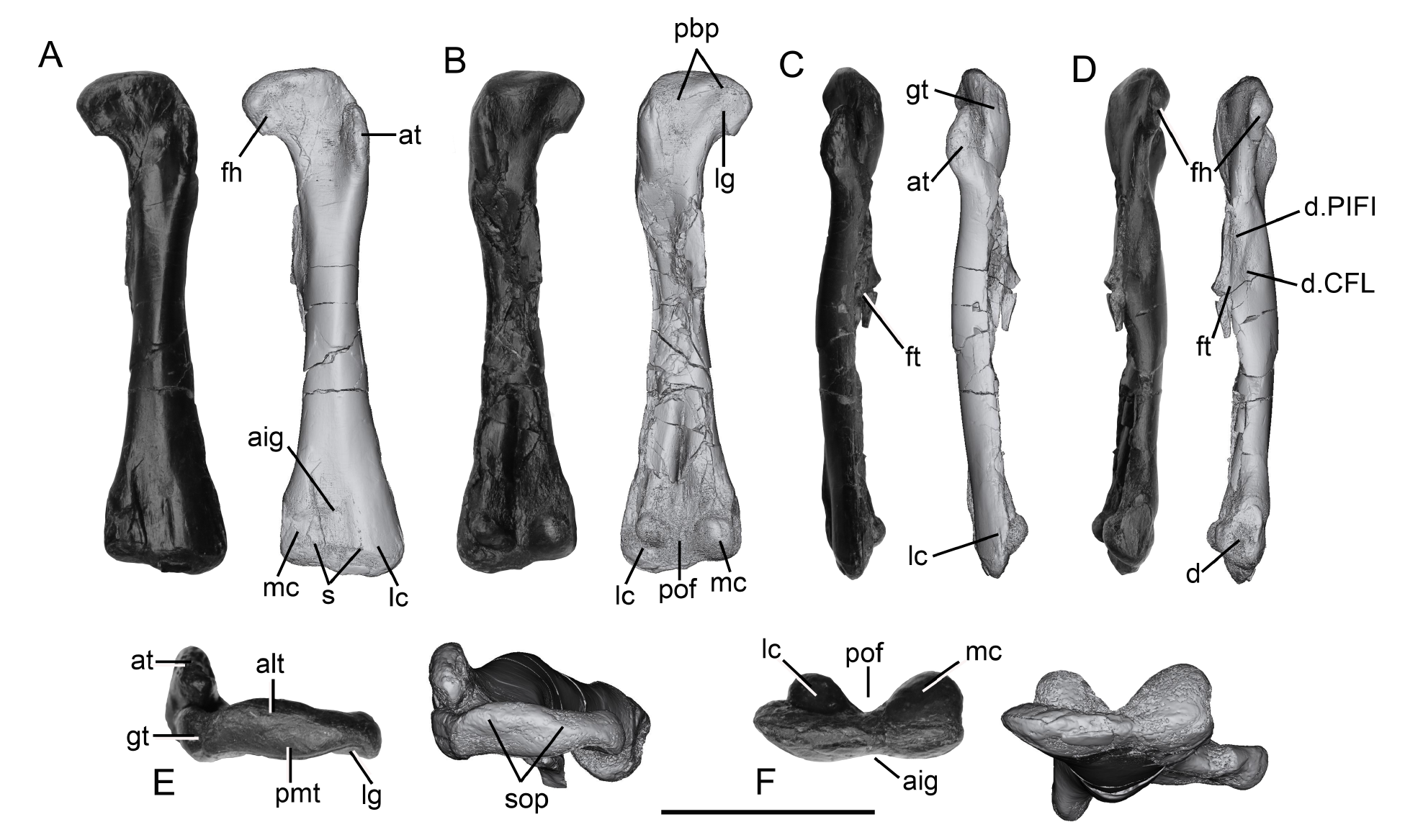
- Holotype femur

Scientific classification
- Kingdom: Animalia
- Phylum: Chordata
- Class: Reptilia
- Clade: Dinosauria
- Clade: †Ornithischia
- Genus: †Archaeocursor; Yao et al., 2025
- Species: †A. asiaticus

Binomial name
- †Archaeocursor asiaticus Yao et al., 2025

= Archaeocursor =

Archaeocursor Temporal range: Early Jurassic, late Sinemurian–Pliensbachian

Genus of early ornithischians

Archaeocursor (meaning "old runner") is an extinct genus of basal ornithischian dinosaurs from the Early Jurassic Ziliujing Formation of China. The genus contains a single species, A. asiaticus, known from a single femur. Archaeocursor represents the oldest and most basal ornithischian described from Asia.

== Discovery and naming ==
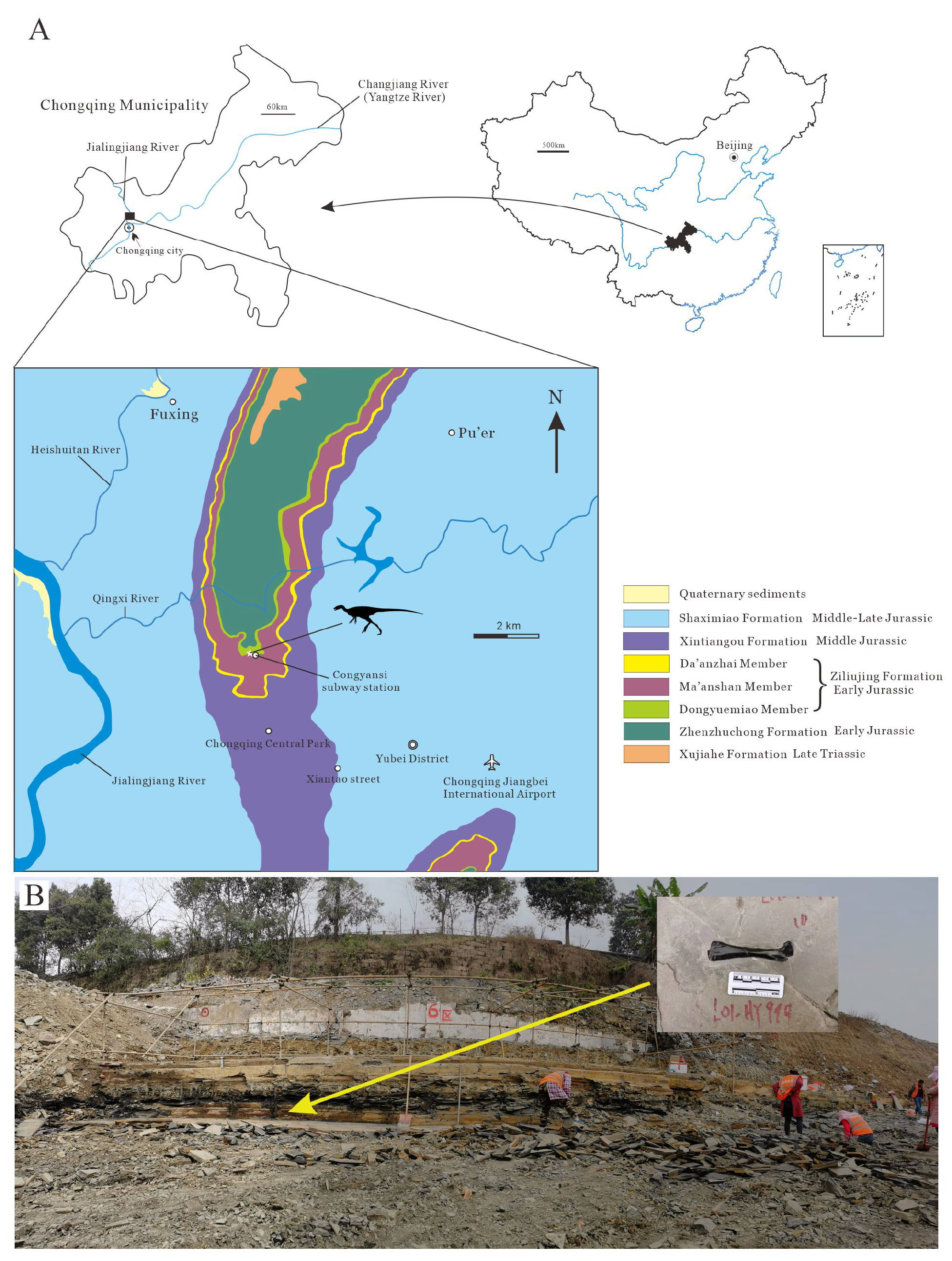
Map and photograph of the Archaeocursor type locality

The Archaeocursor holotype specimen, L01-HY999, was discovered in 2022 in outcrops of the Ziliujing Formation (Dongyuemiao Member) near Chongqing Central Park in Yubei District of Chongqing Municipality, China. The collection of this bone was part of an operation by the Southeast Sichuan Geological Team to salvage paleontological materials during construction in a residential area, and it is now accessioned in the Chongqing Municipal Bureau of Planning and Natural Resources. The specimen consists of an isolated nearly complete left femur.

The specimen was first mentioned in a paper describing the fossil assemblage of the type locality (named the Yuzhou Biota), which represents a lacustrine ecosystem. Well-preserved specimens of diverse plants, invertebrates, fish, and pliosaurids are also represented in the outcrops. This assemblage represents a faunal turnover shortly following the end-Triassic extinction. The discovery of an ornithischian dinosaur in this context is notable; it likely happened to be washed into the lake after its death.

After being announced in December 2024 as a non-finalized preprint, Yao et al. (2025) described Archaeocursor asiaticus as a new genus and species of early ornithischians based on this fossil specimen. The generic name, Archaeocursor, combines the Latin words archaeo, meaning "archaic" or "old" and cursor, meaning "runner". The specific name, asiaticus, is a Latin word meaning "from Asia".

Archaeocursor is one of the only ornithischians known from the Early Jurassic of Asia, with the armored thyreophoran Yuxisaurus being one of the few others. It is the oldest and earliest-diverging named ornithischian from Asia.

== Description ==
Size compared to a human

Using histological methods, Yao et al. (2025) determined that the holotype femur likely belonged to an early adult individual that had not yet reached somatic maturity. Using the holotype femur (93 millimetres (3.7 in) long), they estimated the individual's body length at 1 metre (3.3 ft).

== Classification ==
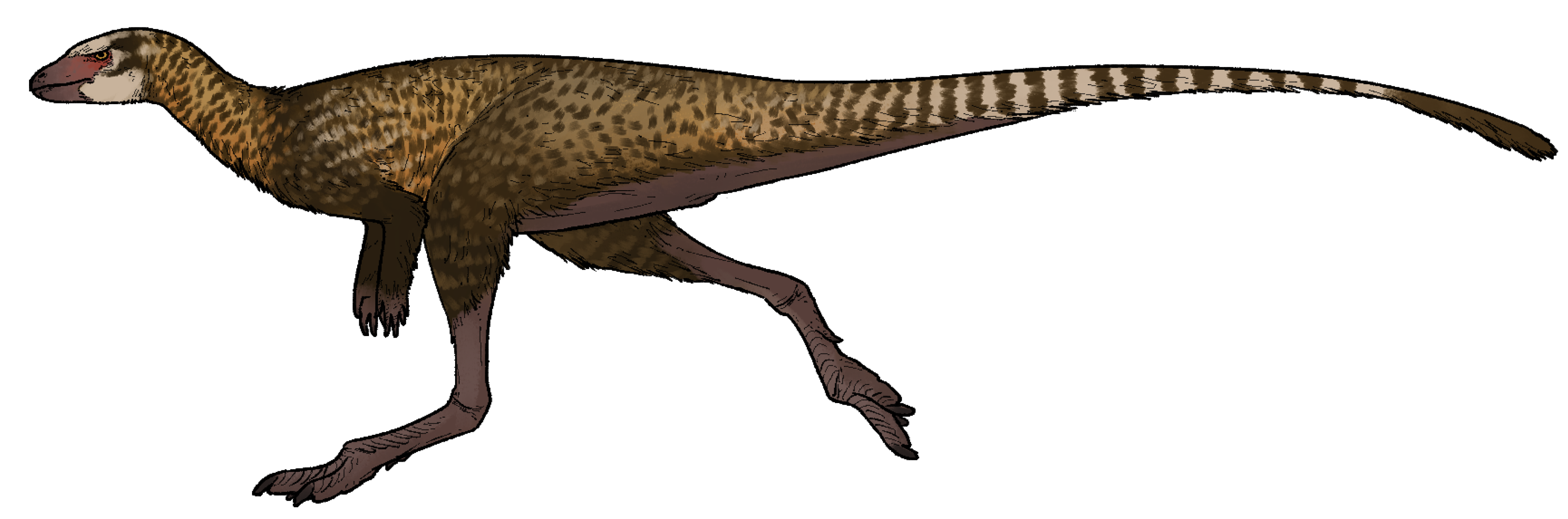
Speculative life restoration

Reconstructed skeleton

In their phylogenetic analyses, Yao et al. (2025) recovered Archaeocursor as an early-diverging member of the Ornithischia, branching crownward of heterodontosaurids as the sister taxon to Eocursor. Eocursor is known from rocks of a similar age in South Africa belonging to the upper Elliot Formation. Yao et al. suggest that the common ancestor of these two genera likely originated in Gondwana before dispersing northward to Laurasia and later East Asia. However, they caution that this hypothesis is tentative, given the fragmentary nature of the Archaeocursor holotype. The results of their phylogenetic analyses are displayed in the cladogram below:

- Ornithischia
  - Pisanosaurus
  - - Heterodontosauridae
    - - - Archaeocursor
        - Eocursor
      - Genasauria
        - Thyreophora
        - Neornithischia
