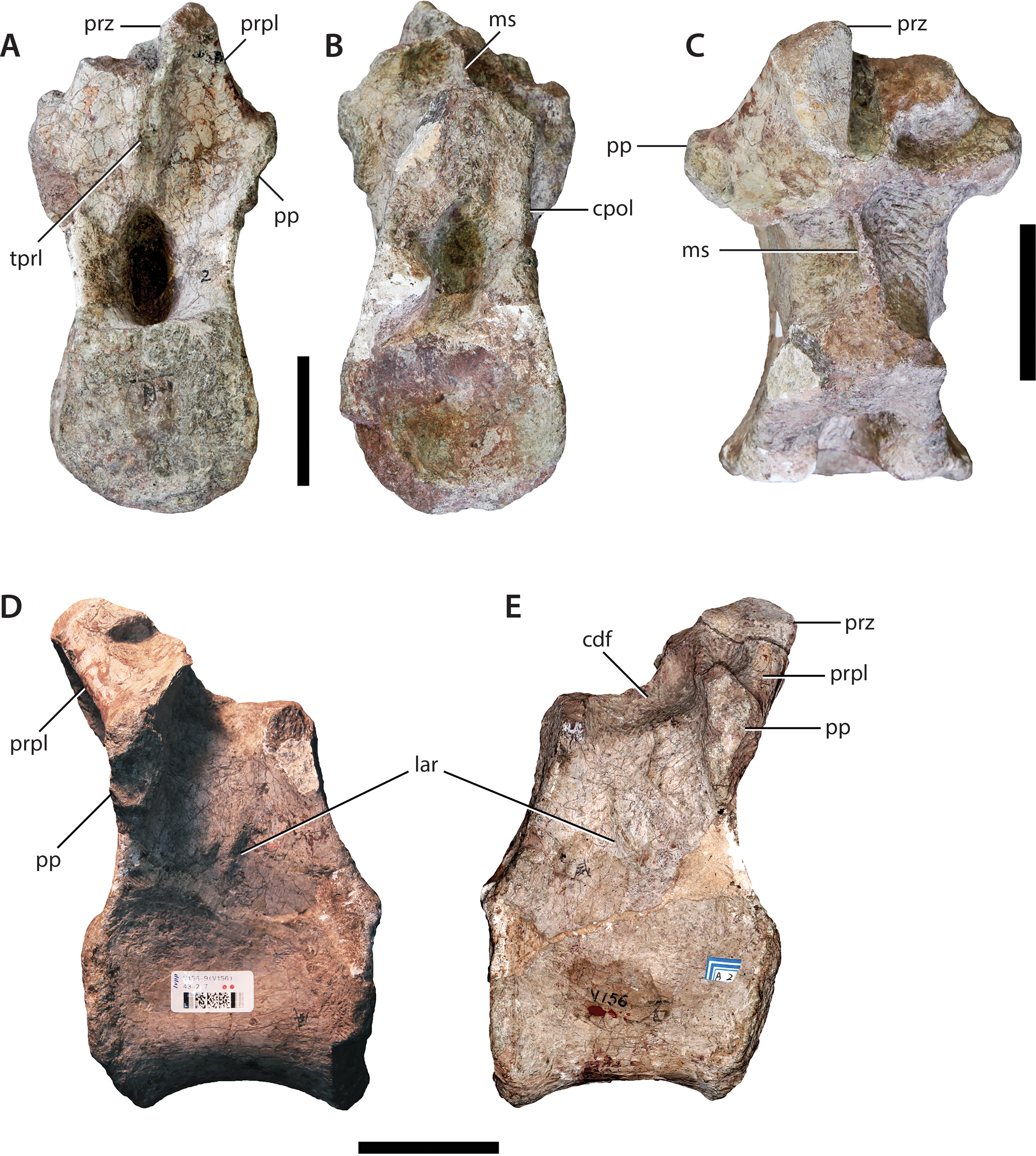
- Dorsal vertebra

Scientific classification
- Kingdom: Animalia
- Phylum: Chordata
- Class: Reptilia
- Clade: Dinosauria
- Clade: Saurischia
- Clade: †Sauropodomorpha
- Clade: †Sauropoda
- Genus: †Sanpasaurus; Young, 1944
- Species: †S. yaoi

Binomial name
- †Sanpasaurus yaoi Young, 1944

= Sanpasaurus =

Sanpasaurus Temporal range: Early Jurassic, 183 Ma

Extinct species of reptile

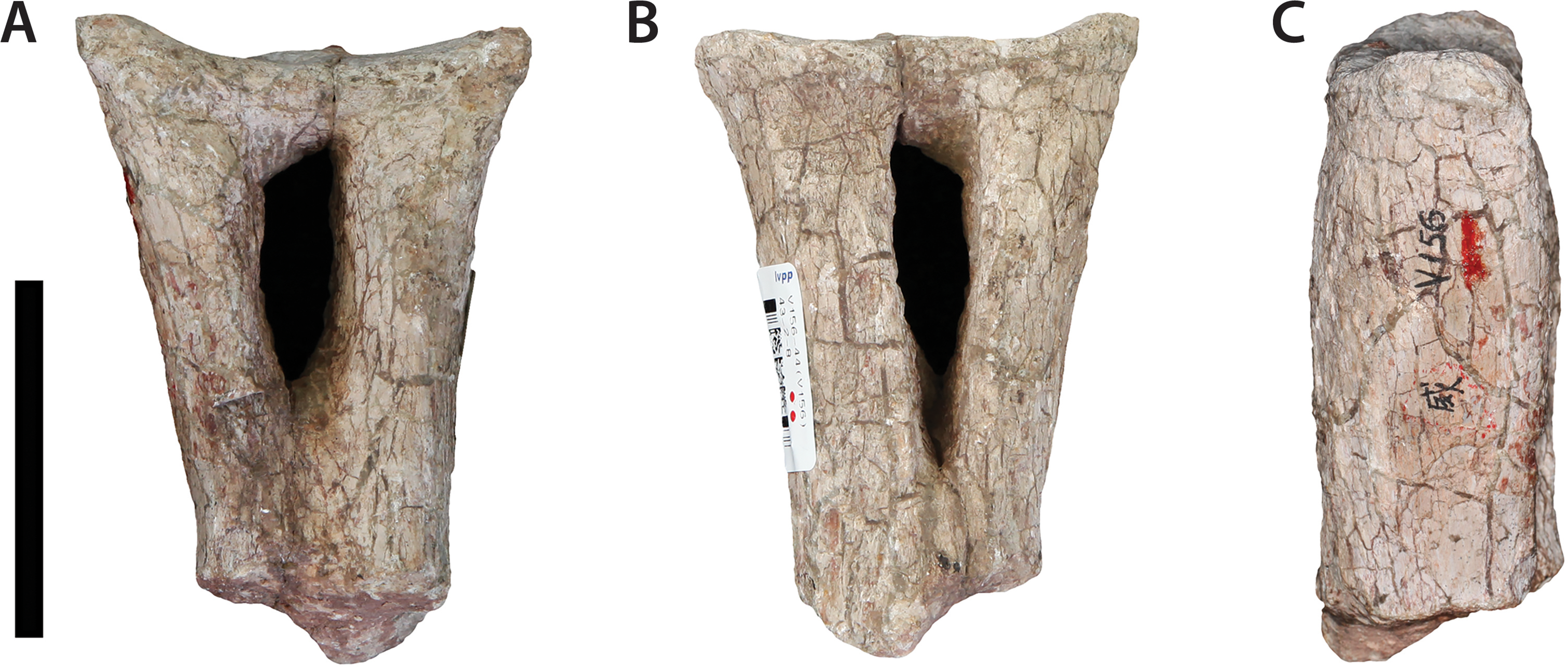
Chevron of Sanpasaurus in anterior view (A), posterior view (B), and lateral view (C), with 5-cm black bar for scale.

Sanpasaurus ("Sanpa lizard") is a poorly known sauropod dinosaur from the Early Jurassic of Sichuan, China. The type species, S. yaoi, was described by Chung Chien Young, in 1944. The type remains, IVPP V.156, consists of 20 vertebrae, scapulae, forelimbs, and some hindlimb bones. Initially reported by Young as an ornithopod ornithischian, this specimen was unambiguously referred to Sauropoda in 2016 by McPhee et al., later refined to a basal gravisaurian position by Pol et al. in 2020 and 2022, closely related to Vulcanodon and Tazoudasaurus. Sanpasaurus is known from remains recovered from the Maanshan Member of the Ziliujing Formation.
