= Zhenzhuchong Formation =

Geologic formation in China

- Stratigraphic range: Hettangian–Pliensbachian
- Type: Geological formation
- Underlies: Ziliujing Formation
- Overlies: Xujiahe Formation
- Thickness: 17-68 metres

Lithology
- Primary: Mudstone
- Other: Sandstone

Location
- Region: Sichuan Province
- Country: China
- Extent: Sichuan Basin

The Zhenzhuchong Formation is an Early Jurassic geologic formation in China. Plesiosaur remains are among the fossils that have been recovered from its strata. Remains of the prosauropod Lufengosaurus huenei have been recovered from this formation As well as dinosaur footprints.

== See also ==
- List of dinosaur-bearing rock formations
  - List of stratigraphic units with indeterminate dinosaur fossils
