= Estheria pallicornis =

Scientific classification
- Kingdom: Animalia
- Phylum: Arthropoda
- Class: Insecta
- Order: Diptera
- Family: Tachinidae
- Subfamily: Dexiinae
- Tribe: Dexiini
- Genus: Estheria
- Species: E. pallicornis

Binomial name
- Estheria pallicornis (Loew, 1873)

Synonyms
- Dinera pallicornis Loew, 1873; Dolichodexia rufipes Brauer & von Berganstamm, 1889

Species of fly

Estheria pallicornis is a species of fly in the family Tachinidae.

== Distribution ==
Kyrgyzstan, Tajikistan, Uzbekistan, Romania, Greece, Italy, Turkey, Afghanistan, Iran, Mongolia, Russia, Transcaucasia, India, Nepal, Pakistan, China.
