= Estheria cristata =

Scientific classification
- Kingdom: Animalia
- Phylum: Arthropoda
- Class: Insecta
- Order: Diptera
- Family: Tachinidae
- Subfamily: Dexiinae
- Tribe: Dexiini
- Genus: Estheria
- Species: E. cristata

Binomial name
- Estheria cristata (Meigen, 1826)

Synonyms
- Dexia cristata Meigen, 1826; Estheria floralis Robineau-Desvoidy, 1830; Estheria imperatoriae Robineau-Desvoidy, 1830; Sarcophaga edax Walker, 1849

Species of fly

Estheria cristata is a species of fly in the family Tachinidae.

== Distribution ==
British Isles, Czech Republic, Poland, Slovakia, Albania, Andorra, Bulgaria, Greece, Italy, Portugal, Spain, Austria, Belgium, France, Germany, Netherlands, Switzerland, Transcaucasia, China.
