= Leptestheriidae =

Scientific classification
- Kingdom: Animalia
- Phylum: Arthropoda
- Clade: Pancrustacea
- Class: Branchiopoda
- Order: Spinicaudata
- Family: Leptestheriidae; Daday, 1923

Family of small freshwater animals

Leptestheriidae is a family of crustaceans in the order Spinicaudata. They are distinguished from the family Cyzicidae by the presence of a rostral spine. Members of Leptestheriidae are believed to graze on detritus.

The family contains five extant genera:

- Eoleptestheria
- Leptestheria [= Leptestheriella)
  including Leptestheria compleximanus
- Maghrebestheria
- Sewellestheria
