= Eoleptestheria =

Scientific classification
- Domain: Eukaryota
- Kingdom: Animalia
- Phylum: Arthropoda
- Class: Branchiopoda
- Subclass: Phyllopoda
- Superorder: Diplostraca
- Order: Spinicaudata
- Family: Leptestheriidae
- Genus: Eoleptestheria; Daday, 1913
- Species: E. ticinensis

Binomial name
- Eoleptestheria ticinensis (Balsamo-Crivelli, 1859)

Genus of small freshwater animals

Eoleptestheria ticinensis is a species of clam shrimp in the family Leptestheriidae. Although up to eight species have formerly been recognised in the genus Eoleptestheria, they are more usually all considered part of one species with a cosmopolitan distribution.
