= Estheria microcera =

Scientific classification
- Kingdom: Animalia
- Phylum: Arthropoda
- Class: Insecta
- Order: Diptera
- Family: Tachinidae
- Subfamily: Dexiinae
- Tribe: Dexiini
- Genus: Estheria
- Species: E. microcera

Binomial name
- Estheria microcera (Robineau-Desvoidy, 1830)

Synonyms
- Dexia patruelis Pandellé, 1896; Myostoma microcera Robineau-Desvoidy, 1830; Myostoma scutellaris Robineau-Desvoidy, 1830

Species of fly

Estheria microcera is a species of fly in the family Tachinidae.

== Distribution ==
Czech Republic, Romania, Slovakia, Ukraine, Italy, Spain, France, Switzerland.
