= Cyclestheria =

Scientific classification
- Domain: Eukaryota
- Kingdom: Animalia
- Phylum: Arthropoda
- Class: Branchiopoda
- Order: Cyclestherida
- Family: Cyclestheriidae
- Genus: Cyclestheria; Sars, 1887

Genus of crustaceans

Cyclestheria is a genus of clam shrimps belonging to the family Cyclestheriidae.

The species of this genus are found in Southern Hemisphere.

Species:

- Cyclestheria hislopi (Baird, 1859)
