= Asmussia murchisoniana =

† Asmussia murchisoniana Temporal range: Devonian

Scientific classification
- Kingdom: Animalia
- Phylum: Arthropoda
- Subphylum: Crustacea
- Class: Branchiopoda
- Order: Spinicaudata
- Genus: † Asmussia
- Species: A. murchisoniana

Binomial name
- † Asmussia murchisoniana (Jones, 1859)

Species of small freshwater animal

Asmussia murchisoniana was a Devonian crustacean of the class Branchiopoda. Like other clam shrimps, Asmussia had a bivalved shell, which was its only preserved part, about 3 millimetres (0.12 in) long. It was probably a filter feeder or a scavenger.
