= Estheria picta =

Scientific classification
- Kingdom: Animalia
- Phylum: Arthropoda
- Class: Insecta
- Order: Diptera
- Family: Tachinidae
- Subfamily: Dexiinae
- Tribe: Dexiini
- Genus: Estheria
- Species: E. picta

Binomial name
- Estheria picta (Meigen, 1826)

Synonyms
- Dexia decolor Pandellé, 1896; Dexia picta Meigen, 1826; Deximorpha marittima Rondani, 1862

Species of fly

Estheria picta is a species of fly in the family Tachinidae.

== Distribution ==
Kyrgyzstan, Czech Republic, Hungary, Romania, Slovakia, Ukraine, Albania, Bosnia and Herzegovina, Bulgaria, Croatia, Greece, Italy, Serbia, Austria, France, Germany, Netherlands, Kazakhstan, Mongolia, Russia, Transcaucasia, China.
