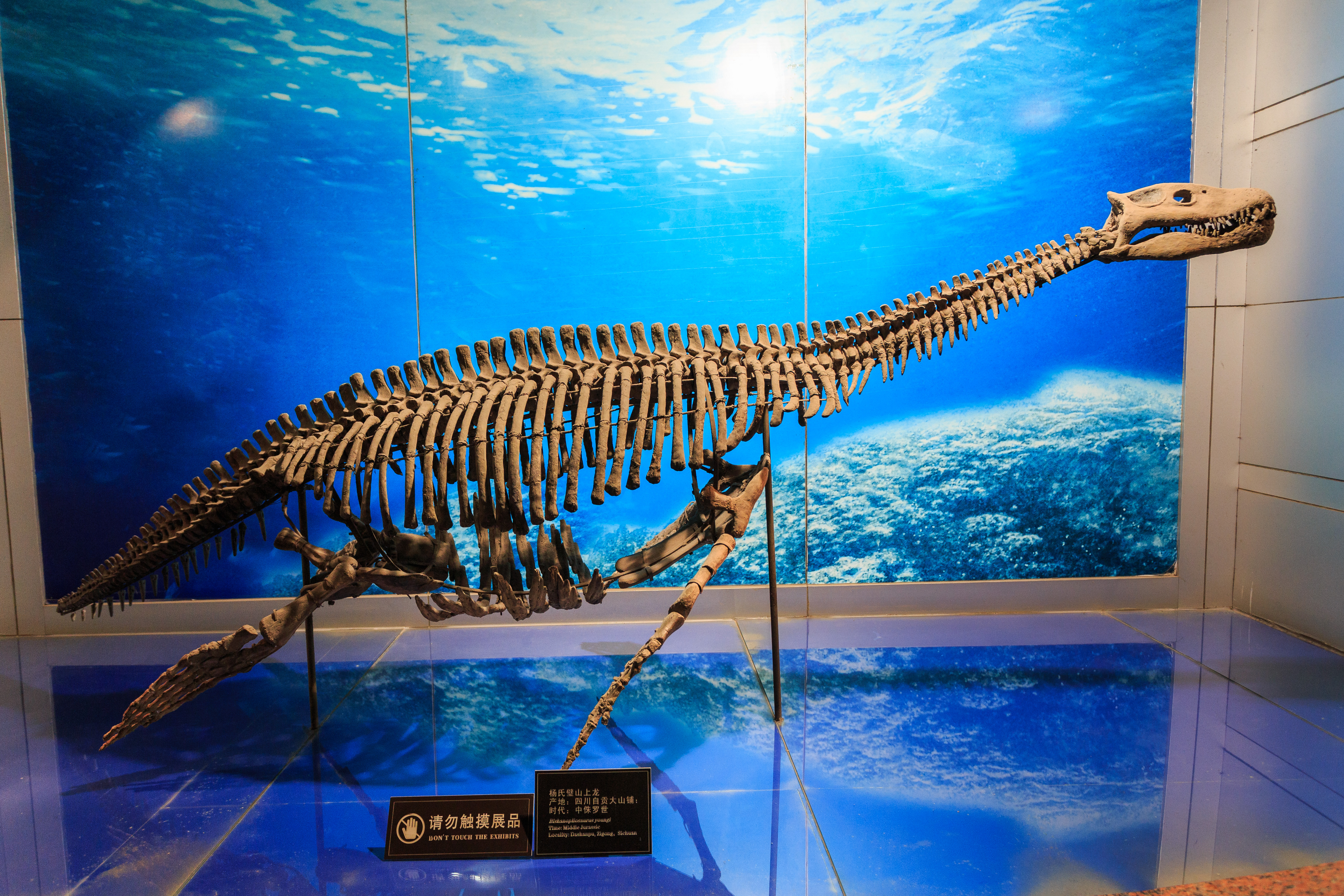
- Skeleton

Scientific classification
- Domain: Eukaryota
- Kingdom: Animalia
- Phylum: Chordata
- Class: Reptilia
- Superorder: †Sauropterygia
- Order: †Plesiosauria
- Suborder: †Pliosauroidea
- Genus: †Bishanopliosaurus; Dong, 1980

Type species
- †Bishanopliosaurus youngi Dong, 1980

Other species
- †B. zigongensis Gao et al., 2003

= Bishanopliosaurus =

Bishanopliosaurus Temporal range: Toarcian-Bajocian

Extinct genus of reptiles

Bishanopliosaurus is a genus of plesiosaur. The type species is B. youngi, based on remains found in the Ziliujing Formation of China.

== Description ==
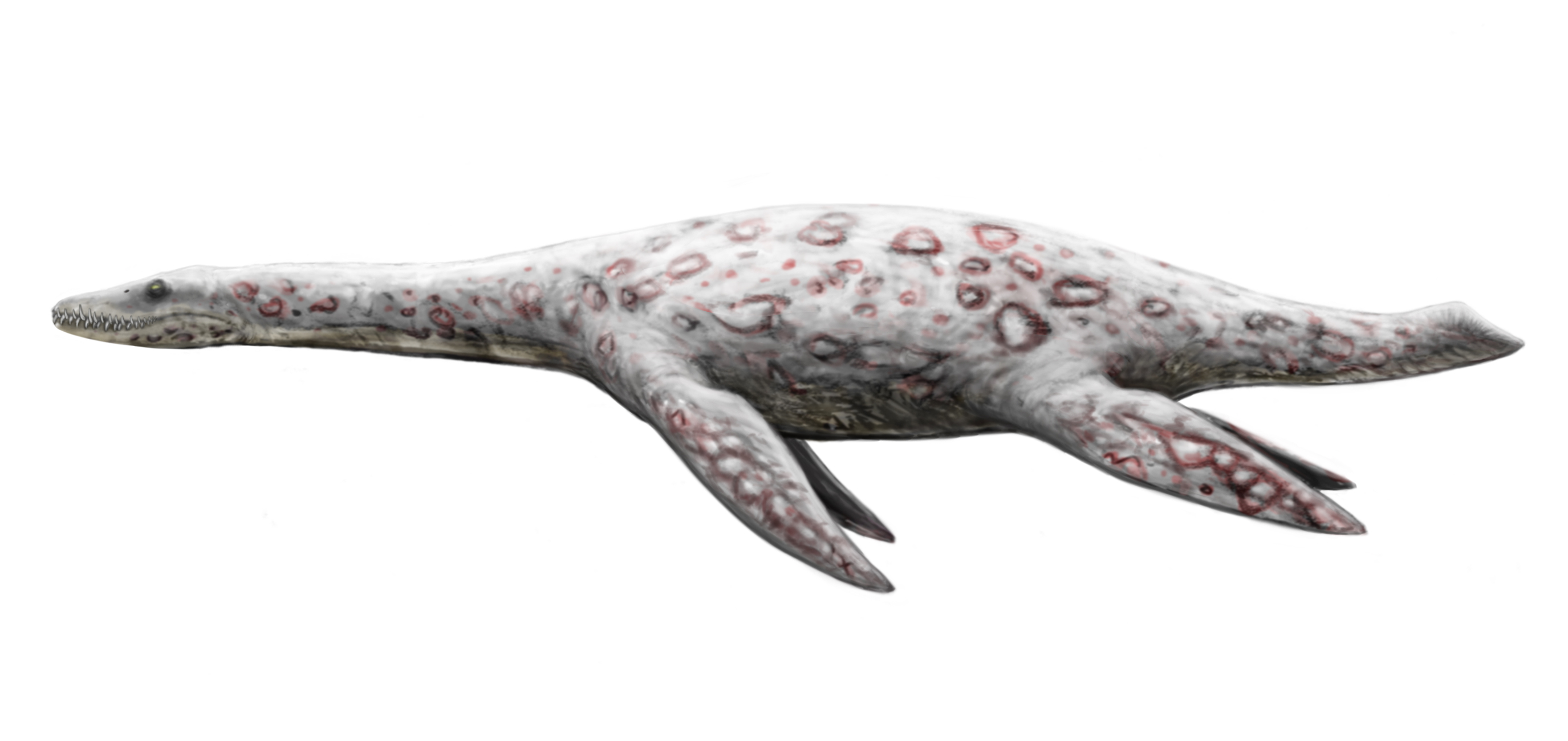
Restoration

Bishanopliosaurus was a small plesiosaur, measuring about 4 m (13 ft) long. It can be differentiated by the bifurcated ribs of its sacrum. Unusually, it appears to be a freshwater plesiosaur. A second species, B. zigongensis, is known from the slightly later Xiashaximiao Formation.

== See also ==
- Timeline of plesiosaur research
- List of plesiosaurs
