= Estheria cinerea =

Scientific classification
- Kingdom: Animalia
- Phylum: Arthropoda
- Class: Insecta
- Order: Diptera
- Family: Tachinidae
- Subfamily: Dexiinae
- Tribe: Dexiini
- Genus: Estheria
- Species: E. cinerea

Binomial name
- Estheria cinerea (Townsend, 1919)

Synonyms
- Hesperodinera cinerea Townsend, 1919

Species of fly

Estheria cinerea is a species of fly in the family Tachinidae.

== Distribution ==
Canada, United States.
