= Estheria bohemani =

Scientific classification
- Kingdom: Animalia
- Phylum: Arthropoda
- Class: Insecta
- Order: Diptera
- Family: Tachinidae
- Subfamily: Dexiinae
- Tribe: Dexiini
- Genus: Estheria
- Species: E. bohemani

Binomial name
- Estheria bohemani (Rondani, 1862)

Synonyms
- Zeuxia bohemani Rondani, 1862

Species of fly

Estheria bohemani is a species of fly in the family Tachinidae.

== Distribution ==
British Isles, Czech Republic, Poland, Denmark, Norway, Sweden, Bulgaria, Italy, Serbia, Spain, Austria, France, Germany, Netherlands, Switzerland, Russia.
