= Chelonipus =

Chelonipus Temporal range: Early Triassic-Eocene

Trace fossil classification
- Ichnogenus: †Chelonipus (Vilienstern) Sarjeant & Langston, 1994

Ichnospecies
- Chelonipus chadronicus; Chelonipus parvus

Turtle trace fossil

Chelonipus is a trace fossil ichnogenus attributed to turtles. Chelonipus ichnospecies are known from the many locations around the world, spanning many millions of years. Tracks assigned to this ichnogenus have been found in the Early Triassic of Wyoming and Utah, Early Jurassic Ziliujing Formation of China, the Late Jurassic Morrison Formation, the Late Paleocene-Early Eocene Chuckanut Formation, and the Eocene of Texas.
