= Imnadia =

Scientific classification
- Domain: Eukaryota
- Kingdom: Animalia
- Phylum: Arthropoda
- Class: Branchiopoda
- Order: Spinicaudata
- Family: Limnadiidae
- Genus: Imnadia; Hertzog, 1935

Genus of crustaceans

Imnadia is a genus of conchostracans found only in Europe. It has occasionally been placed in a monotypic family, "Imnadiidae", but is more usually placed in the Limnadiidae. It contains the following species:

- Imnadia cristata Marinček, 1972 – near Bočar, Serbia
- Imnadia voitestii Botnariuc & Orghidan, 1941 – Romania
- Imnadia banatica Marinček & Valvajter, 1982 – near Novi Kneževac, Serbia
- Imnadia panonica Marinček & Petrov, 1984 – near Kikinda, Serbia
- Imnadia yeyetta Hertzog, 1935 – France
