= Chongqing Central Park =

Urban park in Chongqing, China

- Type: Urban park
- Location: Yubei District, Chongqing, China
- Area: 1.53 km^{2} (0.59 sq mi)
- Created: 2013
- Status: Open all year

Chongqing Central Park (Chinese: 重庆中央公园; pinyin: Chóngqìng Zhōngyāng Gōngyuán) is one of the largest open public urban parks in China. The rectangular-shaped park covers a territory of about 1.53 square kilometers. The purpose of building the park was to provide Chongqing residents with a big open park, like Central Park in New York City and Hyde Park in London, to play outdoor recreational sports and to enjoy nature.

The park is located in Yubei District, Chongqing, China. The northern half of the park is designed to be a huge open square. The Central Square in this park, with an area of 30 hectares, is able to hold at least 100,000 people at once. The Jieqing Avenue (Chinese: 节庆大道; pinyin: Jiéqìng Dàdào), 20 meters wide and 600 meters long, cuts through the northern half of the park. The southern half of the park is designed to be a natural area, with grassland, forests, hills, and freshwater ponds.

== Transport ==
=== Metro stations ===
- Central Park West station
- Central Park station
- Central Park East station
