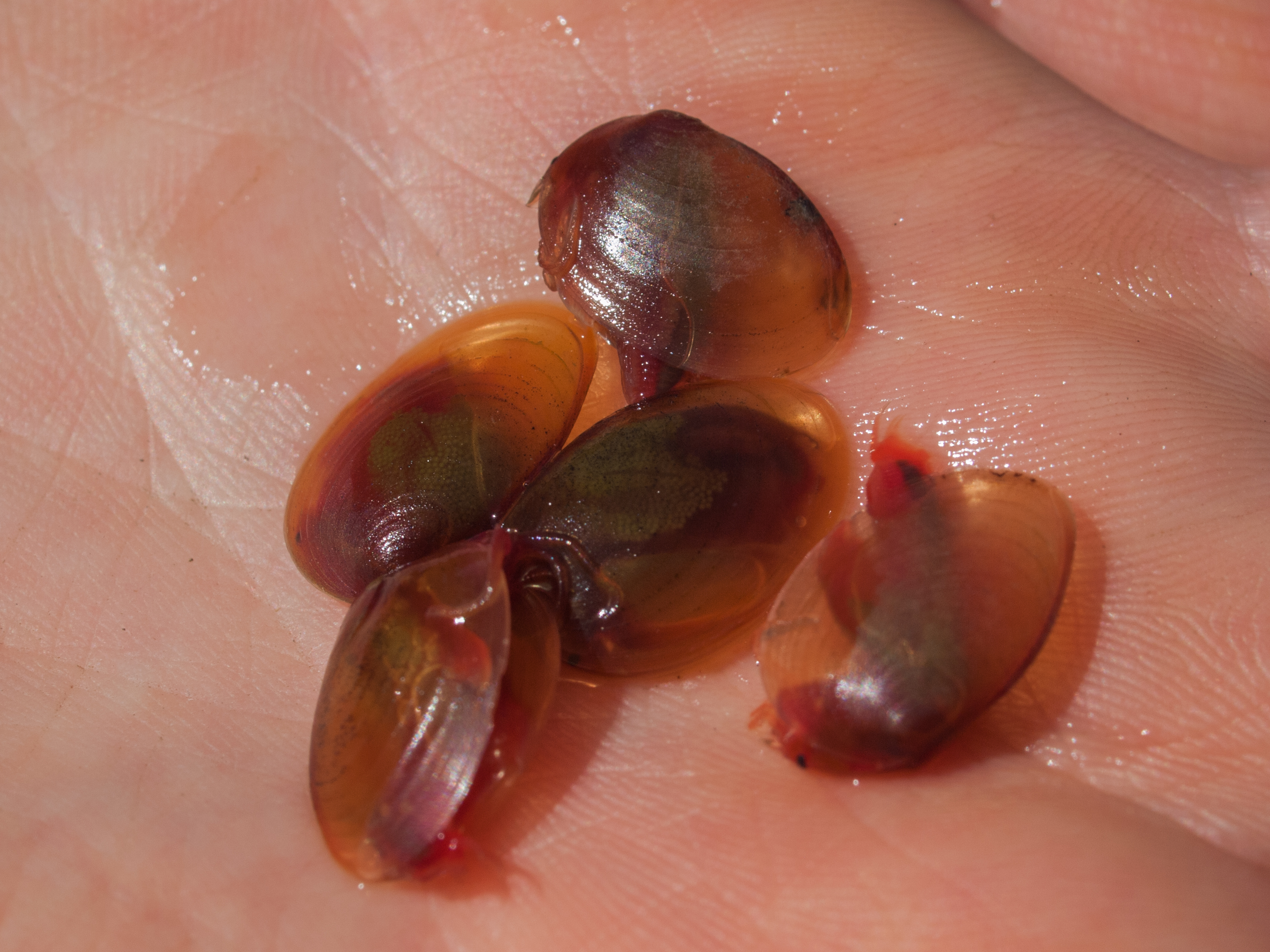

Scientific classification
- Kingdom: Animalia
- Phylum: Arthropoda
- Clade: Pancrustacea
- Class: Branchiopoda
- Order: Spinicaudata
- Family: Cyzicidae; Stebbing, 1910

= Cyzicidae =

Family of small freshwater animals

Cyzicidae is a family of crustaceans in the order Spinicaudata. They are distinguished from the family Leptestheriidae by the absence of a rostral spine. Some members of Cyzicidae are known to burrow through mud, leading to speculation that they may be filter feeders, but Martin reports that their mouthparts are indistinguishable from Leptestheriidae, which are believed to be grazers.

The family contains four extant genera:

- Caenestheria
- Caenestheriella
- Cyzicus
- Eocyzicus
