= Lynceus (crustacean) =

Scientific classification
- Kingdom: Animalia
- Phylum: Arthropoda
- Class: Branchiopoda
- Order: Laevicaudata
- Family: Lynceidae
- Genus: Lynceus; Müller, 1776

Genus of small freshwater animals

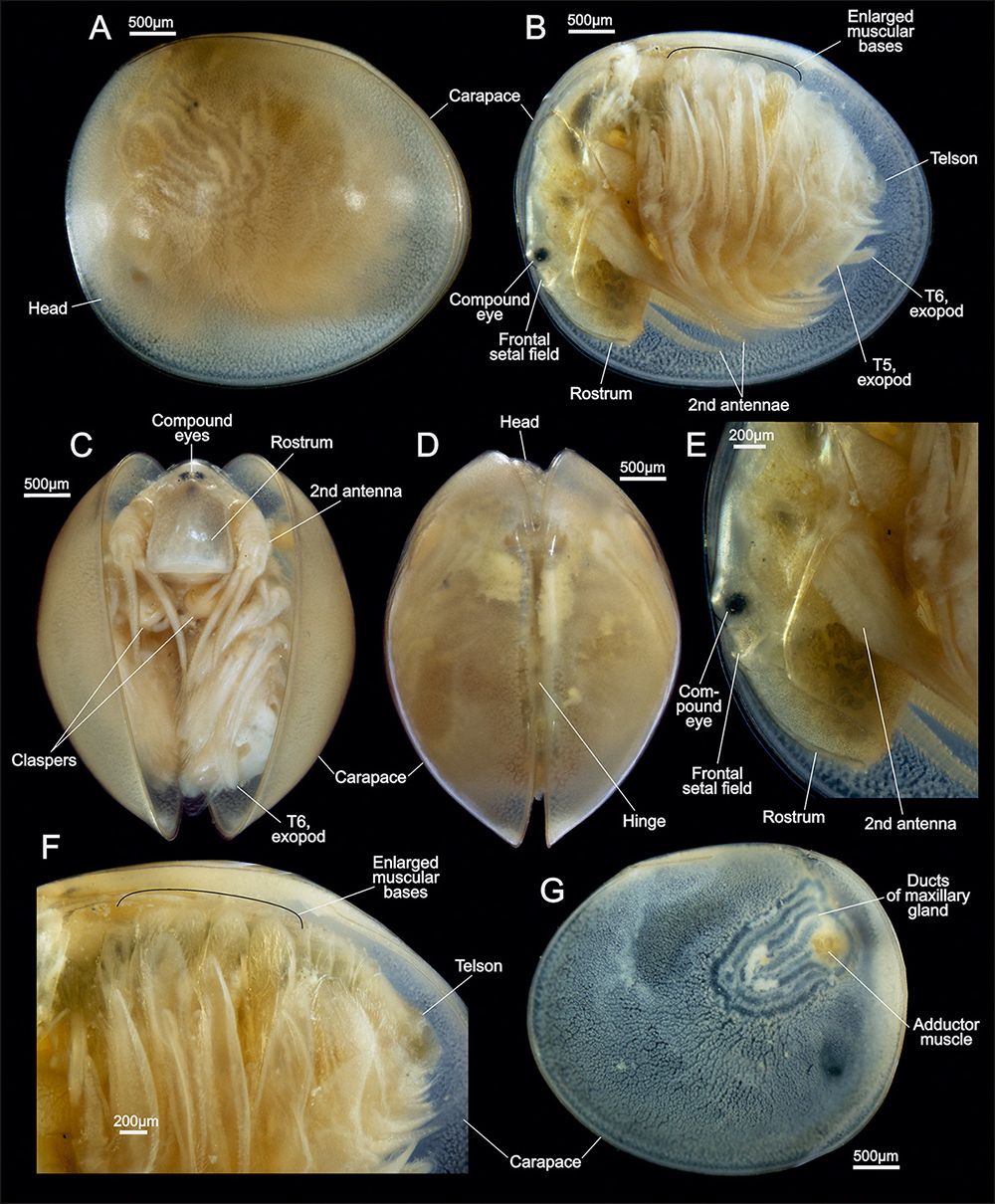
Microscopy views of Lynceus grossipedia, showing the carapace and internal anatomy.

Lynceus is a genus of clam shrimp in the family Lynceidae. There are about 13 described species in Lynceus.

== Species ==
These 13 species belong to the genus Lynceus:

- Lynceus aequatorialis Daday, 1927^{i g}
- Lynceus andronachensis Botnariuc, 1947^{g}
- Lynceus biformis (Ishikawa, 1895)^{g}
- Lynceus brachyurus O. F. Müller, 1776^{i g b} (holarctic clam shrimp)
- Lynceus brevifrons (Packard, 1877)^{i g}
- Lynceus gracilicornis (Packard, 1871)^{i g}
- Lynceus insularis Olesen, Pöllabauer, Sigvardt & Rogers, 2016^{g}
- Lynceus mallinensis Pessacq, Epele & Rogers, 2011^{g}
- Lynceus mucronatus (Packard, 1875)^{i g}
- Lynceus quadrangularis Leydig, 1860^{g}
- Lynceus rostratus Koch, 1841^{g}
- Lynceus rotundirostris (Daday, 1902)^{i g}
- Lynceus tropicus Daday, 1927^{i g}

Data sources: i = ITIS, c = Catalogue of Life, g = GBIF, b = Bugguide.net
