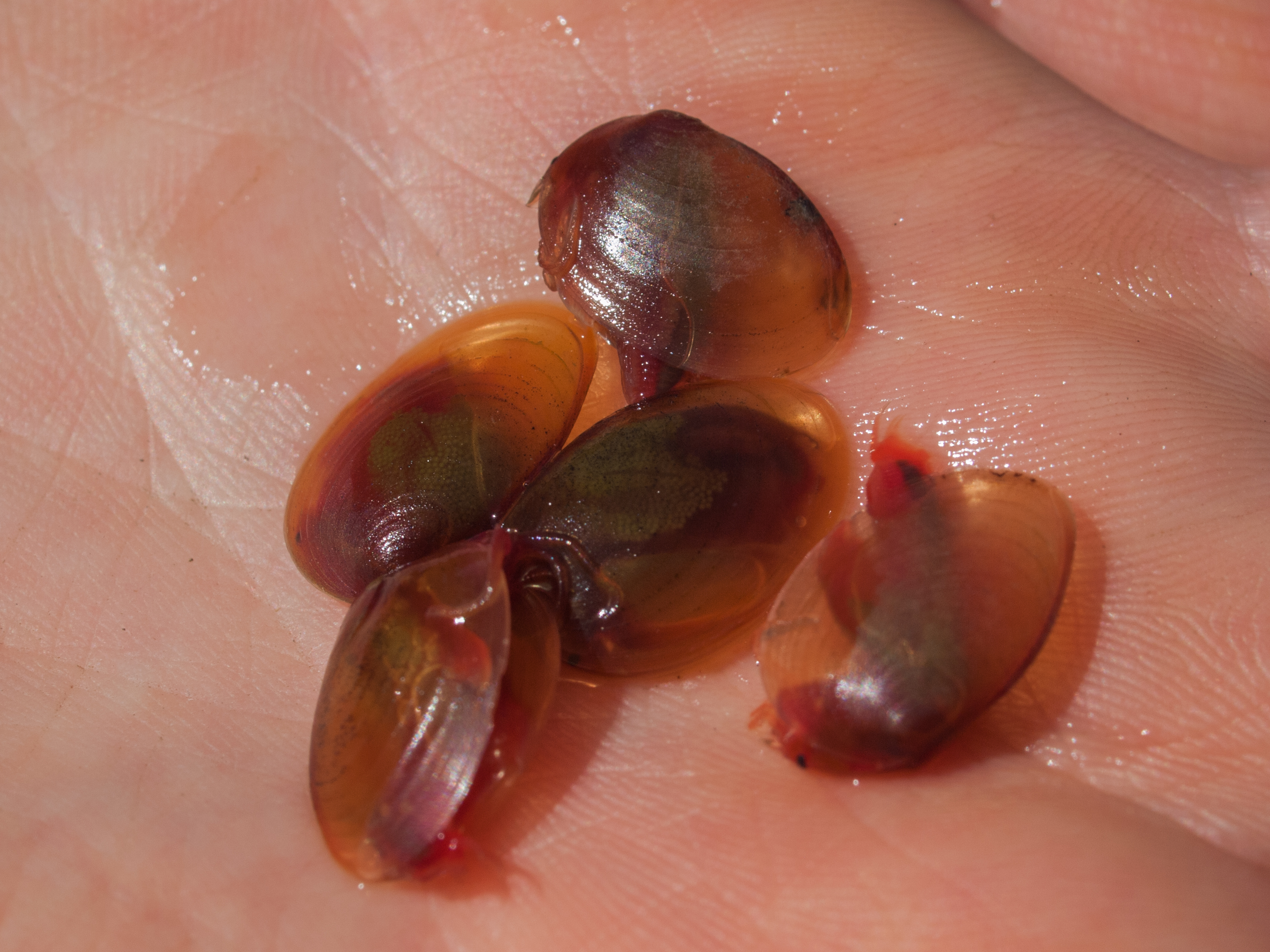
- Cyzicus californicus

Scientific classification
- Kingdom: Animalia
- Phylum: Arthropoda
- Class: Branchiopoda
- Order: Spinicaudata
- Family: Cyzicidae
- Genus: Cyzicus; Audouin, 1837

Type species
- Cyzicus tetracera (Krynicki, 1830)

Species
- See Text

Synonyms
- Bairdestheria Raymond, 1946; unaccepted; Caenestheriella Daday, 1915 fide Margalef, 1953 fide Straskraba, 1965; unaccepted; Estheria Rüppell in Strauss-Durchheim, 1837; nomen praeoccupatum; Isaura Joly, 1842; nomen praeoccupatum; Opsipolygrapta Novojilov, 1954; unaccepted

= Cyzicus (crustacean) =

Genus of small freshwater animals

Cyzicus is a genus of clam shrimps in the family Cyzicidae. Identified by Jean Victoire Audouin in 1837, the genus was reidentified as Caenestheriella by Eugen von Daday in 1910. Cyzicus tetracerus is the type species.

There are about 24 species in the genus, with an additional 10 uncertain:

== Species ==
- Cyzicus aegyptiacus Daday, 1914: 290
- Cyzicus algericus Daday, 1914: 261
- Cyzicus belfragei (Packard, 1871) – Belfrage clam shrimp
- Cyzicus bucheti (Daday, 1913)
- Cyzicus californicus (Packard, 1874) – California clam shrimp
- Cyzicus crinitus (Thiele, 1900)
- Cyzicus donaciformis (Baird, 1849)
- Cyzicus eductus Daday, 1914: 127
- Cyzicus ehrenbergi (Daday, 1913)
- Cyzicus elongatus (Mattox, 1957) – elongate clam shrimp
- Cyzicus gifuensis (Ishikawa, 1895)
- Cyzicus gihoni (Baird, 1859)
- Cyzicus grubei (Simon, 1886) sensu Alonso, 1996
- Cyzicus gynecius (Mattox, 1950) – Mattox clam shrimp
- Cyzicus hierosolymitanus (Fischer, 1860)
- Cyzicus jonesi (Baird, 1862)
- Cyzicus ludhianatus (Battish, 1981)
- Cyzicus madagascarica (Daday, 1914)
- Cyzicus mexicanus (Claus, 1872) – Mexican clam shrimp
- Cyzicus morsei (Packard, 1871) – Morse clam shrimp
- Cyzicus nepalensis Uéno, 1967
- Cyzicus rubra (Daday, 1913)
- Cyzicus sinensis Hu, 1988
- Cyzicus tetracerus (Krynicki, 1830) fide Auduoin, 1837 (sensu Alonso, 1996)

== Uncertain taxa ==
- Cyzicus boysii (Baird, 1849); nomen dubium
- Cyzicus brasiliensis (Baird, 1849); nomen dubium fide Daday, 1914
- Cyzicus bravaisii Audouin, 1837; nomen nudum fide Todd, 1952
- Cyzicus caldwelli (Baird, 1852); nomen dubium fide Daday, 1914
- Cyzicus dallasi (Baird, 1852); nomen dubium fide Daday, 1914
- Cyzicus gubernator (Klunzinger, 1864); taxon inquirendum fide Daday 1914
- Cyzicus lobatus Wolf (in litteris) in Daday, 1914; nomen nudum
- Cyzicus lofti (Baird, 1849); nomen dubium fide Daday, 1914
- Cyzicus melitensis (Baird, 1849); nomen dubium fide Daday 1914
- Cyzicus paradoxus Daday, 1914; nomen dubium
- Cyzicus politus Baird, 1849; nomen dubium

== Species brought into synonymy ==
- Cyzicus altus Shu, Rogers, Chen, & Yang, 2015; accepted as Ozestheria altus (Shu, Rogers, Chen, & Yang, 2015)
- Cyzicus annandalei (Daday, 1913); accepted as Ozestheria annandalei Daday, 1913
- Cyzicus borceai Daday, 1913; accepted as Cyzicus tetracerus (Krynicki, 1830) fide Auduoin, 1837 (sensu Alonso, 1996)
- Cyzicus chyzeri Daday, 1913; accepted as Cyzicus tetracerus (Krynicki, 1830) fide Auduoin, 1837 (sensu Alonso, 1996)
- Cyzicus cycladoides (Joly, 1841); accepted as Cyzicus tetracerus (Krynicki, 1830) fide Auduoin, 1837 (sensu Alonso, 1996)
- Cyzicus cyrenaicus (Vecchi, 1922); accepted as Cyzicus tetracerus (Krynicki, 1830) fide Auduoin, 1837 (sensu Alonso, 1996)
- Cyzicus dictyon (Spencer & Hall, 1896); accepted as Ozestheria lutraria (Brady, 1886)
- Cyzicus dimorphus (Daday, 1913); accepted as Cyzicus ehrenbergi (Daday, 1913)
- Cyzicus dubiosus Daday, 1913; accepted as Cyzicus tetracerus (Krynicki, 1830) fide Auduoin, 1837 (sensu Alonso, 1996)
- Cyzicus echinatus (Daday, 1913); accepted as Cyzicus donaciformis (Baird, 1849)
- Cyzicus ellipticus (Sars, 1896); accepted as Ozestheria elliptica Sars, 1896
- Cyzicus fallax Daday, 1913; accepted as Cyzicus tetracerus (Krynicki, 1830) fide Auduoin, 1837 (sensu Alonso, 1996)
- Cyzicus fimbriatus (Brehm, 1935); accepted as Cyzicus ehrenbergi (Daday, 1913)
- Cyzicus hungaricus Daday, 1913; accepted as Cyzicus tetracerus (Krynicki, 1830) fide Auduoin, 1837 (sensu Alonso, 1996)
- Cyzicus indicus (Gurney, 1906); accepted as Ozestheria indica (Gurney, 1906)
- Cyzicus intermedius Daday, 1913; accepted as Cyzicus tetracerus (Krynicki, 1830) fide Auduoin, 1837 (sensu Alonso, 1996)
- Cyzicus irritans Wolf (in Daday, 1914); accepted as Eocyzicus irritans Daday, 1914
- Cyzicus klunzingeri Wolf (in Daday, 1914); accepted as Eocyzicus klunzingeri Daday, 1914
- Cyzicus lutraria (Brady, 1886); accepted as Ozestheria lutraria (Brady, 1886)
- Cyzicus michaelseni Daday, 1913; accepted as Cyzicus ehrenbergi (Daday, 1913)
- Cyzicus misrai (Tiwari, 1962 fide Tiwari, 1996); accepted as Ozestheria annandalei Daday, 1913
- Cyzicus newcombii (Baird, 1866); accepted as Cyzicus californicus (Packard, 1874)
- Cyzicus obliquus (Sars, 1905); accepted as Eocyzicus obliquus (Sars, 1905)
- Cyzicus ornatus Smirnov, 1932; accepted as Cyzicus tetracerus (Krynicki, 1830) fide Auduoin, 1837 (sensu Alonso, 1996)
- Cyzicus packardi (Brady, 1886); accepted as Ozestheria packardi (Brady, 1886)
- Cyzicus pilosus Rogers, Thaimuangphol, Saengphan, & Sanoamuang, 2013; accepted as Ozestheria pilosa (Rogers, Thaimuangphol, Saengphan, & Sanoamuang, 2013)
- Cyzicus romanus Daday, 1913; accepted as Cyzicus tetracerus (Krynicki, 1830) fide Auduoin, 1837 (sensu Alonso, 1996)
- Cyzicus romanus Daday, 1914; accepted as Cyzicus tetracerus (Krynicki, 1830) fide Auduoin, 1837 (sensu Alonso, 1996)
- Cyzicus roonwali (Tiwari, 1962), fide Tiwari, 1996; accepted as Ozestheria annandalei Daday, 1913
- Cyzicus rubra (Henry, 1924); accepted as Ozestheria rubra Henry, 1924; nomen praeoccupatum
- Cyzicus rufa Dakin, 1914; accepted as Ozestheria rufa (Dakin, 1914)
- Cyzicus sarsi (Sayce, 1903); accepted as Ozestheria sarsii (Sayce, 1903)
- Cyzicus sarsii (Sayce, 1903); accepted as Ozestheria sarsii (Sayce, 1903)
- Cyzicus setosus (Pearse, 1912); accepted as Cyzicus californicus (Packard, 1874)
- Cyzicus seurati Daday, 1914 (fide Maeda-Martínez et al., 2002); accepted as Cyzicus mexicanus (Claus, 1872)
- Cyzicus sibericus Daday, 1913; accepted as Cyzicus tetracerus (Krynicki, 1830) fide Auduoin, 1837 (sensu Alonso, 1996)
- Cyzicus simoni Daday, 1914; accepted as Cyzicus tetracerus (Krynicki, 1830) fide Auduoin, 1837 (sensu Alonso, 1996)
