= Estheria (fly) =

Scientific classification
- Kingdom: Animalia
- Phylum: Arthropoda
- Clade: Pancrustacea
- Class: Insecta
- Order: Diptera
- Family: Tachinidae
- Subfamily: Dexiinae
- Tribe: Dexiini
- Genus: Estheria; Robineau-Desvoidy, 1830

Type species
- Estheria imperatoriae Robineau-Desvoidy, 1830

Synonyms
- Deximorpha Rondani, 1856; Dexiomera Curran, 1933; Dexiomorpha Bezzi & Stein, 1907; Dexiomorpha Mik, 1887; Dolichodexia Brauer & von Berganstamm, 1889; Esteria Rondani, 1862; Hesperodinera Townsend, 1919; Myiostoma Bezzi, 1907; Myostoma Robineau-Desvoidy, 1830; Paramyiostoma Villeneuve, 1911; Parestheria Stein, 1924; Stictodexia Villeneuve, 1913; Synthomocera Rondani, 1865; Syntomocera Schiner, 1861

Genus of flies

Estheria cristiana feeding on flower

Estheria is a genus of flies in the family Tachinidae.

== Species ==
- Estheria acuta (Portschinsky, 1881)
- Estheria albipila (Mesnil, 1963)
- Estheria alticola Mesnil, 1967
- Estheria angustifrons (Portschinsky, 1881)
- Estheria atripes Villeneuve, 1920
- Estheria bohemani (Rondani, 1862)
- Estheria buccata (Emden, 1947)
- Estheria bucharensis (Kolomiets, 1974)
- Estheria cinerea (Townsend, 1919)
- Estheria cinerella Mesnil, 1967
- Estheria cristata (Meigen, 1826)
- Estheria crosi (Villeneuve, 1920)
- Estheria flavipennis Herting, 1968
- Estheria iberica Tschorsnig, 2003
- Estheria intermedia Lahiri, 2003
- Estheria lacteipennis Mesnil, 1967
- Estheria latigena (Villeneuve, 1911)
- Estheria lesnei (Villeneuve, 1913)
- Estheria litoralis (Rondani, 1862)
- Estheria maculipennis Herting, 1968
- Estheria magna (Baranov, 1935)
- Estheria magnum (Baranov, 1935)
- Estheria microcera (Robineau-Desvoidy, 1830)
- Estheria nigripes (Villeneuve, 1920)
- Estheria notopleuralis (Emden, 1947)
- Estheria pallicornis (Loew, 1873)
- Estheria picta (Meigen, 1826)
- Estheria simonyi (Brauer & von Berganstamm, 1891)
- Estheria surda (Curran, 1933)
- Estheria tatianae (Kolomiets, 1974)
- Estheria turneri (Emden, 1947)
