= Lynceidae =

Scientific classification
- Kingdom: Animalia
- Phylum: Arthropoda
- Clade: Pancrustacea
- Class: Branchiopoda
- Order: Laevicaudata
- Family: Lynceidae; Baird, 1845

Family of small freshwater animals

Lynceidae is a family of clam shrimp in the order Laevicaudata. There are 3 genera and around 44 described species in Lynceidae.

== Genera ==
These genera belong to the family Lynceidae:

- Lynceiopsis Daday, 1912
- Lynceus O.F. Müller, 1776
- Paralimnetis Gurney, 1931

Else for former Limnetis Lovén, 1847, see Lynceus O.F. Müller, 1776 (sensu Martin & Belk, 1988)
