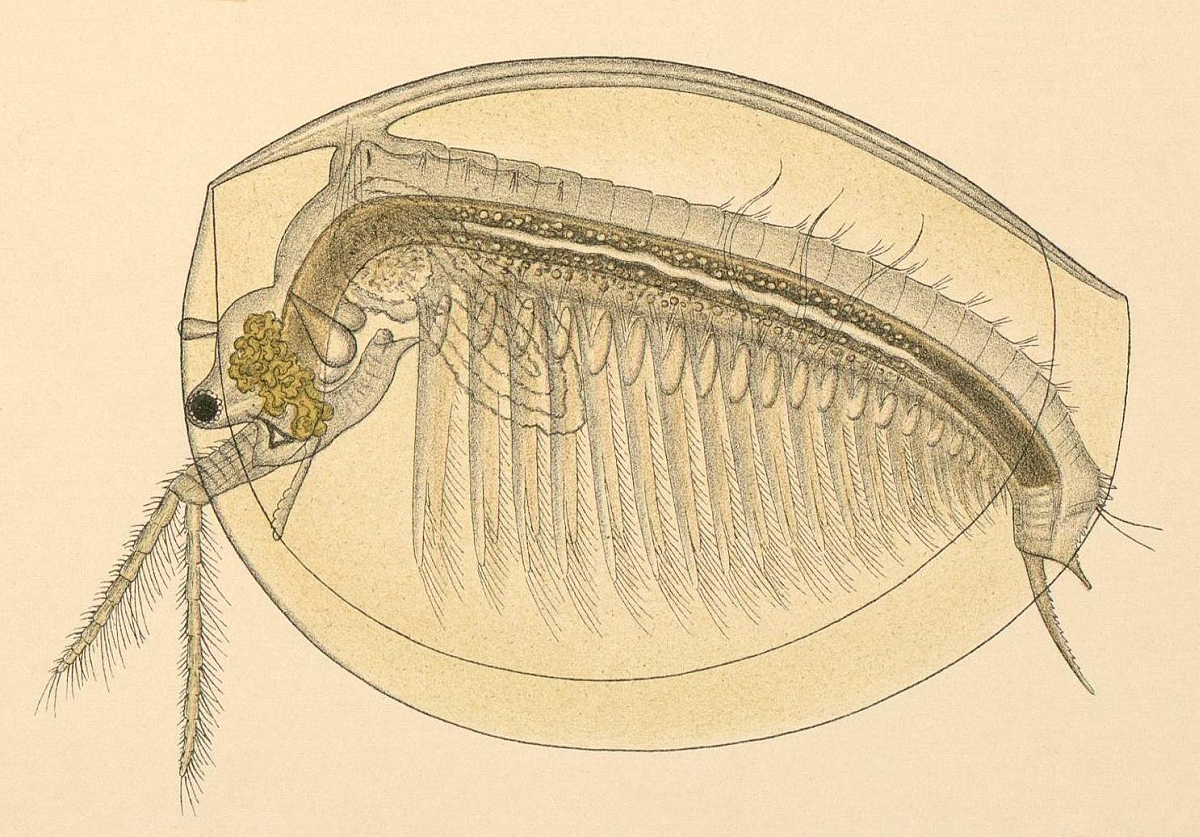
- Limnadia lenticularis

Scientific classification
- Kingdom: Animalia
- Phylum: Arthropoda
- Clade: Pancrustacea
- Class: Branchiopoda
- Order: Spinicaudata
- Family: Limnadiidae; Burmeister, 1843

= Limnadiidae =

Family of small freshwater animals

Limnadiidae is a family of crustaceans in the order Spinicaudata that live in seasonal wetlands, inland saline pools and lakes. They are found on all the world's continents except Antarctica, and are distinguished from other families in the same order by the fact that the cephalic fornicies do not extend forwards. The family contains eight extant genera:

- Afrolimnadia Rogers et al., 2012
- Calalimnadia Rabet & Rogers, 2012
- Eulimnadia Packard, 1874
- Imnadia Hertzog, 1935
- Limnadia Brongniart, 1820
- Limnadopsis Spencer & Hall, 1896
- Metalimnadia Mattox, 1952
- Paralimnadia Sars, 1896
