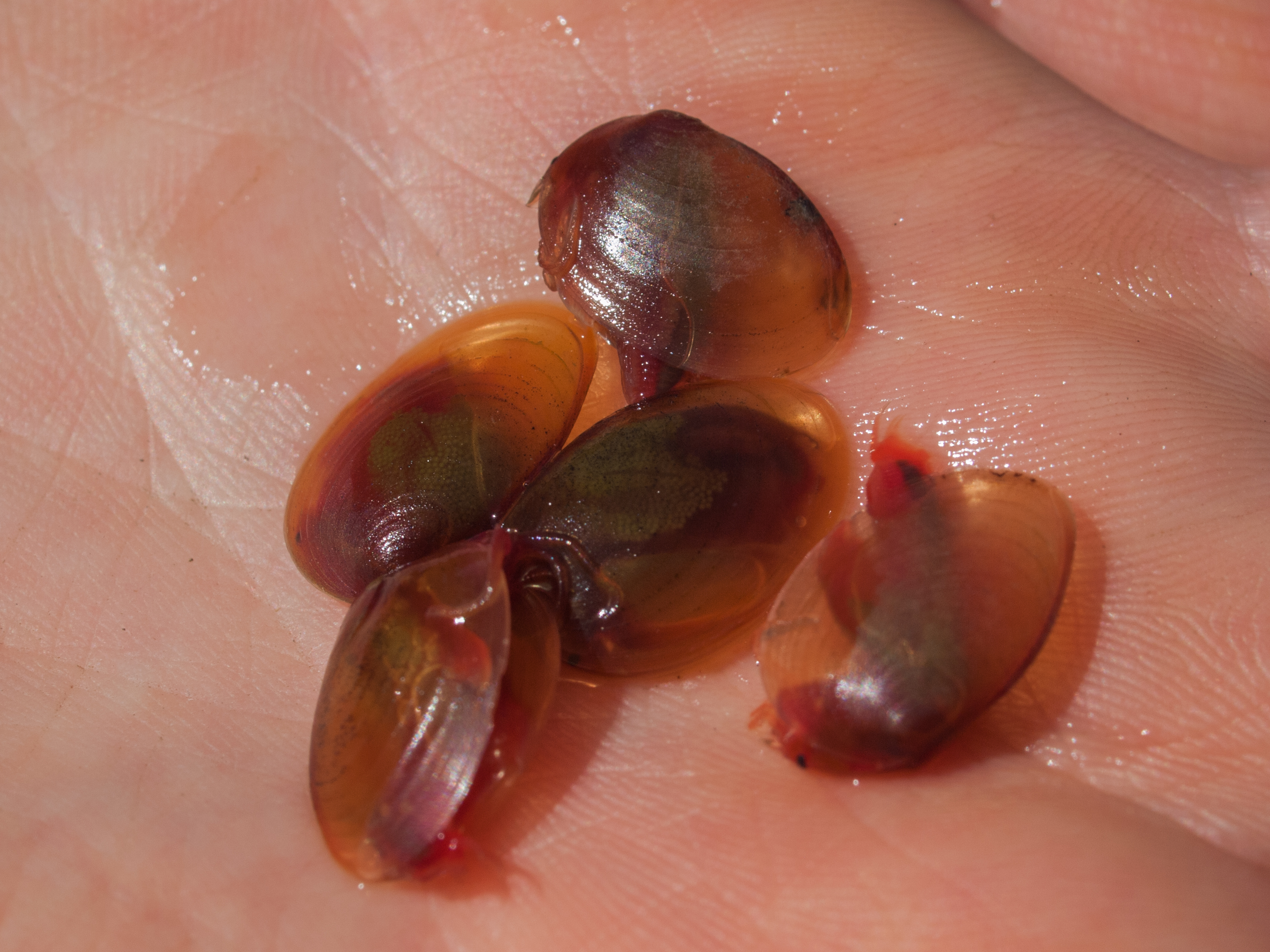
- California clam shrimp, Cyzicus californicus

Scientific classification
- Kingdom: Animalia
- Phylum: Arthropoda
- Class: Branchiopoda
- Subclass: Phyllopoda
- Superorder: Diplostraca

Groups included
- Cyclestherida Sars, 1899; Laevicaudata Linder, 1945; Spinicaudata Linder, 1945

Cladistically included but traditionally excluded taxa
- Anomopoda G.O. Sars, 1865; Ctenopoda G.O. Sars, 1865; Haplopoda G.O. Sars, 1865; Onychopoda G.O. Sars, 1865

= Clam shrimp =

Clam shrimp Temporal range: Devonian–Recent

Orders of aquatic crustaceans sharing a common name

Clam shrimp are a group of branchiopod crustaceans that possess bivalved carapaces, which resemble the shells of unrelated bivalved molluscs. They were traditionally classified in the order Conchostraca, but this group later proved to be paraphyletic, because Diplostraca, the water fleas, are nested within the clade of clam shrimps; this implies certain groups of water fleas are closer to certain groups of clam shrimp than either are to other Diplostracan groups which they may resemble. Clam shrimp are now divided into three orders, Cyclestherida, Laevicaudata, and Spinicaudata, in addition to the fossil family Leaiidae. Their fossil record is known from at least the Devonian period and perhaps before.

== Characteristics ==
Both valves of the shell are held together by a strong closing muscle. The animals react to danger by contracting the muscle, so that the valves close tightly and the crustacean, as if dead, lies motionlessly at the bottom of the pool.

In most species the head is dorsoventrally compressed. The sessile compound eyes are close together and located on the forehead; in the genus Cyclestheria they are truly fused. In front of them is a simple naupliar eye. The first pair of antennae is reduced and unsegmented. The second pair of antennae, however, is long and biramous. Both branches are covered with numerous bristles. The crustaceans swim primarily by swooping the antennae. In the common genus Lynceus, which can open its spherical valves wide, the thoracic legs move in an oar-like manner along with the antennae.

The number of segments constituting the thorax varies from 10 to 32, and the number of legs varies accordingly. They are similar in structure to the legs of tadpole shrimp, and similarly, their size decreases from front to back. In females, the outer lobes of several middle legs are modified into long, upward-bending threadlike outgrowths, used to hold the eggs on the dorsal side of the body under the shell. However, the main functions of the thoracic legs are respiration and carrying food forward to the mouth. The gills are basically the outer lobes of all thoracic legs that are closest to the base of the leg. The legs are in constant movement, and the water between the valves of the carapace is quickly renewed. The body ends in a large chitinised telson, which is either laterally compressed and bears a pair of large hooks, or dorsoventrally compressed, with short hooks.

== Reproduction and development ==
=== Reproduction ===
Clam shrimp have different reproductive strategies. For example, within the family Limnadiidae are found dioecious (male-female), hermaphroditic (only hermaphrodites), and androdioecious (male-hermaphrodite) species.

=== Life cycle ===
The eggs are surrounded by a tough shell and can withstand drying out, freezing, and other hostile conditions. In some species these eggs can hatch after as long as 7 years.

When the egg arrives in a suitable body of water, such as a pool, a larva hatches out at the nauplius stage (the nauplius stage is absent in Cyclestherida). Clam shrimp nauplii are distinguished by very small front antennae. At the second stage (metanauplius), the larva develops the small shell. They develop very quickly. For instance, Cyzicus reaches sexual maturity in 19 days after hatching.

== Taxonomy ==
Extant clam shrimp belong to three orders, divided into five families; some notable genera and prehistoric taxa are also listed:

Spinicaudata Linder, 1945

- Cyzicidae Stebbing, 1910
  - Caenestheria
  - Caenestheriella
  - Cyzicus
  - Eocyzicus
- Eosestheriidae Zhang & Chen, 1976 (fossil)
  - Bairdestheria
  - Menucoestheria Gallego & Covacevich, 1998
- Euestheridae Defretin, 1965 (fossil)
  - Laxitextella Kozur, 1982
- Leptestheriidae Daday, 1923
  - Eoleptestheria
  - Leptestheria
  - Leptestheriella
  - Maghrebestheria
  - Sewellestheria
- Limnadiidae Baird, 1849 (including Imnadiidae)
  - Afrolimnadia
  - Calalimnadia
  - Eulimnadia
  - Imnadia
  - Limnadia
  - Limnadiopsis
  - Limnadiopsidum
  - Metalimnadia
- Palaeolimnadiidae Tasch, 1956 (fossil)
  - Krasiestheria Olempska, 2004 (tentatively placed here)

Cyclestherida Sars, 1899

- Cyclestheriidae Sars, 1899
  - Cyclestheria
  - Paracyclestheria

Laevicaudata Linder, 1945

- Lynceidae Baird, 1845
  - Leptestheriella
  - Limnetis
  - Lynceiopsis
  - Lynceus
  - Paralimnetis

=== Fossil record ===
Modern clam shrimp have little significance to humans. However, extinct species of these crustaceans are often studied by geologists. In freshwater deposits, generally poor in fossils, the well-preserved clam shrimp shells are found quite often. They help identify the age of the corresponding strata, a practice known as biostratigraphy.

During the past geological periods clam shrimp were apparently more numerous and diverse than they are now. 300 extinct species are known, twice that of living species. The oldest clam shrimp, such as Asmussia murchisoniana, were found in Devonian deposits. Many extinct species, mostly Triassic specimens, once lived in marine environments, where no extant clam shrimp inhabit today.

== See also ==
- Isoxys
